= Chronology of Chudasama dynasty =

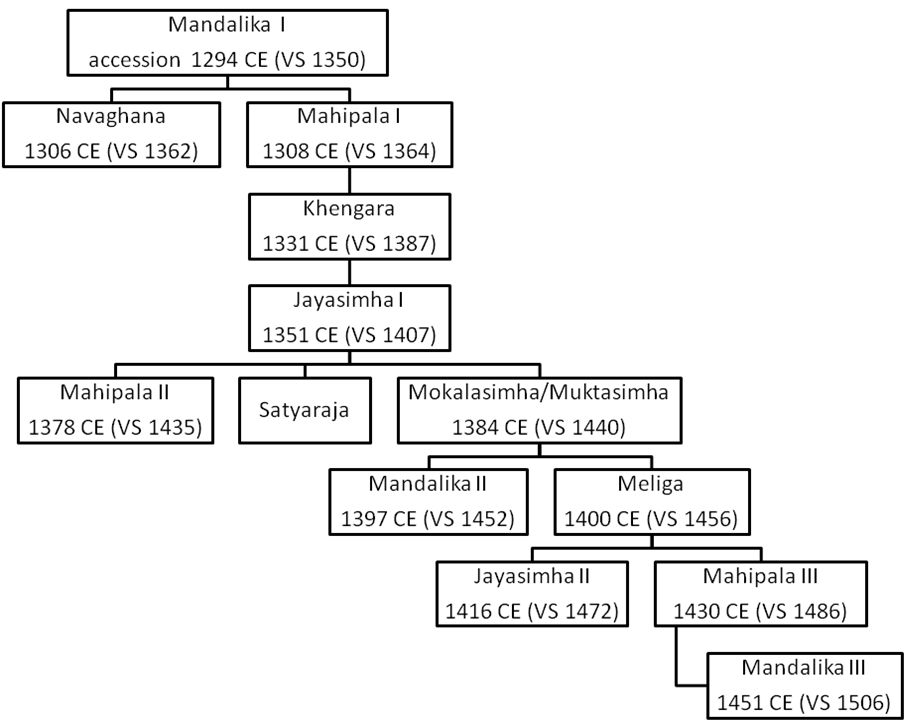
Chronology and genealogy of the later half of Chudasama dynasty based on inscriptions

The early history of the Chudasama dynasty in Saurashtra (now part of Gujarat, India) is largely lost. Bardic legends vary significantly in names, sequence, and numbers, rendering them unreliable as historical sources. Mandalika Kavya, a Sanskrit poem by Gangadhara, provides some information on the dynasty, though it holds limited historical accuracy. Certain inscriptions from the period offer early genealogical details, but these also vary in their order of succession. Historians like Ranchhodji Diwan, A. K. Forbes, James Burgess, and Gaurishankar Oza have attempted to determine a more consistent genealogy and chronology. Based on dates from inscriptions linked to Chudasama kings and other literary sources, the genealogy and chronology of the dynasty's later period are now relatively established. It is known that they ruled approximately from Vikram Samvat (VS) 900 to VS 1527, or around 875 CE to 1472 CE.

== Chronology and genealogy ==
=== Based on inscriptions ===
There is no inscription available from the period before the reign of King Mandalika I. However, it is clear that the Chudasama dynasty had established its rule in the Saurashtra region before the Chaulukya king Mularaja came to power in Anahilavada, as literary sources mention battles between Chudasama and Chaulukya kings, including Mularaja and Jayasimha Siddharaja. The Dhandusar inscription (VS 1445) identifies the dynasty’s founder as Chudachandra

A Vanthali inscription records a King Mandalika, whose kingdom was seized by Jagatsimha, a feudatory of the Chaulukya king Viradhavala. This King Mandalika must be a different ruler than the Mandalika mentioned in later genealogies. Since Viradhavala is known to have lived around VS 1288, this event is likely dated accordingly. The Vanthali inscription itself dates to VS 1346, indicating that Jagatsimha’s family likely retained control until then. Later, a Chudasama king named Mandalika apparently regained Vanthali as Chaulukya rule weakened, marking a new starting point for the dynasty’s later genealogy in subsequent inscriptions.

The Chudasama dynasty continued to rule until VS 1527 (1472 CE), when Junagadh was conquered by the Gujarat Sultan Mahmud Begada. Since inscriptions describe the Chudasama resistance against the Gujarat Sultans, it can be concluded that they were the most powerful dynasty in the Saurashtra region during that period.

==== Genealogy and chronology table ====
Ruler	Relationship	Reign (CE)	Accession Year (Samvat)	Ra Khengar Mahal/ Neminath Temple inscription on Mount Girnar	Hani Vav Dhandhusar inscription	Mahaprabhu Bethak near Revatikund, Girnar inscription	Uparkot Junagadh
Mandalika I	son of Yashodhavala	1294–1306	1350	Mandalika		Mandalika	
Navaghana	son of Mandalika I	1306–1308	1362	Navaghana			
Mahipala I	son of Mandalika I	1308–1331	1364	Mahipaladeva		Mahipala	
Khengara	son of Mahipala I	1331–1351	1387	Shangara (Khangara)	Khengara	Khengara	
Jayasimha I	son of Khangara	1351–1378	1407	Jayasimhadeva	Jayasimha	Jayasimha	
Mahipala II	son of Jayasimha I	1378–1384	1435				
Mokalasimha/Muktasimha	son of Jayasimha I	1384–1396	1440	Mokalasimha	Mokalasimha	Muktasimha	
Mandalika II	son of Mokalasimha	1396–1400	1452			Mandalika	
Meliga	son of Mokalasimha	1400–1416	1456	Melangadeva		Meliga	Maligadeva
Jayasimha II	son of Meliga	1416–1430	1472			Jayasimha	
Mahipala III	son of Meliga	1430–1451	1486	Mahipaladeva			Mahipala
Mandalika III	son of Mahipala III	1451–1472	1507	Mandalika			Mandalika

=== Early attempts ===
==== Ranchhodji Amarji (1825) ====
Ranchhodji Amarji, the Diwan (prime minister) of the Junagadh State, wrote the Tarikh-i-Sorath in Persian in 1825. In this work, Ranchhodji documented that the Chudasama dynasty belonged to the Chandravanshi (lunar) lineage, claiming they were descendants of Sadashiva and originally hailed from Sindh. He noted a tradition of rulers with recurring names, including nine named Navghan, ten named Jakhra, and eleven named Alansingh, among others, who ruled in succession.

He provided the following chronology of Chudasama rulers in Tarikh-i-Sorath:

Accession date (Samvat)	Date (CE)	Ruler	Relation	Reign	Notable events
—	—	Rao Dayat	—	—	Married the daughter of Siddha Rao (possibly Jayasimha Siddharaja) of Gujarat.
874	817	Navghan	Son of Dayat	Saved by Devayat Bodar of Alidhar (Gir Somnath District) from Siddha Rao as a child; later regained Junagadh and conquered Sindh.	
916	859	Khengar	Son of Navghan	36 years	Attacked Patan; slain by Siddha Rao. Story of Ranik Devi, who ended her life in VS 952 (895 CE).
952	—	Mularaja	Son of Khengar	35 years and 6 months	—
987	—	Jakhra	Son of Mularaja	21 years	—
1009	—	Ganraj	Son of Jakhra	38 years and 4 months	—
1047	—	Mandalika	Son of Ganraj	48 years and 2 months	Allied with Bhimadeva against Mahmud of Ghazni, who attacked Somnath temple.
1095	—	Hamira Deva	Son of Mandalika	13 years and some days	—
1108	—	Vijayapala	Son of Hamira Deva	54 years and 6 months	—
1162	—	Navaghana	Son of Vijayapala	2 years	—
1184	—	Mandalika	Son of Navghana	11 years	—
1195	—	Alansingh	Son of Mandalika	14 years	—
1209	—	Dhanesh	Son of Alansingh	5 years (some records state 9 years)	—
1214	—	Navghan	Son of Navghan	9 years	—
1224	1167	Khengar	—	46 years	—
1270	—	Mandalika	Son of Khengar	22 years, 3 months, 22 days (some records state 32 years)	—
1302	—	Mahipala	Son of Mandalika	34 years, 5 months, 3 days	Some records state 34 years.
12 Magshar 1336	1279	Khengar	Son of Mahipala	54 years and 13 days	Conquered Diu and 17 other islands; repaired Somnath temple; took refuge on Mount Girnar after Junagadh was taken by Sams Khan under Tughluq orders.
1390	—	Jayasingh	Son of Khengar	11 years, 8 months, 11 days	—
6 Bhadarva 1402	—	Mugatsingh (or Mokalsingh)	Son of Jayasingh	14 years, 13 days	—
4 Ashvad 1412	—	Madhupat	Son of Mugatsingh	5 years, 1 month, 6 days	—
10 Kartika Sud 1421	—	Mandalika	Son of Madhupat	17 years, 6 months, 3 days	—
1439	—	Malek	Brother of Mandalika (son of a slave-girl)	11 years, 11 months, 24 days	—
1468	—	Jayasingh	Son of Malek	18 years, 3 months, 14 days	Captured Zanzira (?)
1486	—	Khengar	Son of Jayasingh	22 years	Ahmad Shah of Gujarat attacked Junagadh; Khengar and his diwan Hira Singh took refuge in Uparkot in 1470 (?) where Khengar died.
1489	—	Mandalika	—	—	Kiwamu-al-Mlik, Amir of Sultan Mahmud, attacked Junagadh in VS 1520 and captured Mandalika in 1527 (1470 CE). Mandalika embraced Islam and died in Ahmedabad, where he is buried in Manek Chowk. His son was later restored as Jagirdar with the title of Raizada.

Following the defeat by Mahmud Begada, Mandalika’s descendants were granted the jagir of Junagadh as Jagirdars. However, real power was exercised by the Thanadar, appointed by the rulers in Ahmedabad and later by provincial governors.

Accession date (Samvat)	Date (CE)	Ruler as Jagirdar	Relation	Reign	Thanadar
1529/1528	—	Bhupat Singh	—	31 years	Tatar Khan, son of Zafar Khan
1560	—	Khengar	Son of Bhupat Singh	22 years	Malik Ayaz and Tatar Khan Ghori
1581	—	Navghan	Son of Khengar	28 years, 11 months, 20 days	Sayyid Kasam and Mujahid Khan Belim
1608	—	Shri Singh	Son of Navghan	34 years, 1 month, 10 days	Khan Azam Kokaltash became Subahdar of Ahmedabad, replacing Khan Khanan, and conquered Junagadh in 1633.
1642	—	Khengar	Son of Shri Singh	22 years	Under Mahmud Shah and Bahadur Shah of Gujarat, Junagadh was granted as a jagir to their amirs, with Tatar Khan serving as Thanadar for 13 years.

==== James Burgess (1876-1882) ====
James Burgess translated the Târikh-i-Soraṭh into English under the title Târikh-i-Soraṭh: A History of the Provinces of Soraṭh and Hâlâr in Kâthiâwâd, based on Gujarati translations of Persian manuscripts. The translation, edited by James W. Watson, was published in 1882. Burgess consulted several manuscripts and referenced an inscription from the Vastupal Jain Temple on Mount Girnar to verify the chronology provided by Ranchhodji Amarji. He initially published these findings in his Report on the Antiquities of Kathiawad and Kachh and included editor notes in the translation. Burgess also incorporated information from other sources and made conjectural corrections to dates, marking uncertain dates with "(?)" when converting to CE format.

In the Târikh-i-Soraṭh, Ranchhodji lists the reigns of the first four kings, starting with Navaghana I, extending over 151 years, followed by a 22-year gap between Navaghana II and his successor Mandalika I. Burgess added Khengar II (c. 1107 CE) to the chronology, who was omitted by Ranchhodji. Additionally, Burgess noted that Ranchhodji excluded Navghana (c. 1235) after Mandalika, whom he assigned a reign of 22 years and 3.75 months, beginning in VS 1270, with Mahipala’s reign beginning in VS 1302. This adjustment left a 10-year gap, which may coincide with the reign of Navaghana IV. Ranchhodji’s genealogy includes Mugatsingh’s successors in the order of Madhupat (VS 1416-1421), Mandalika (VS 1421-1439), and Malek (VS 1439-1450), possibly derived from the Revatikunda inscription, which lists: Mandalika III, his son Mahipala, his son Khangara IV, his son Jayasimha, and his son Mugatsimha, with sons Mandalika and Melak. Burgess retained the dates VS 1421 and 1439 but suggested modifications to VS 1428 and 1433.

Burgess observed that some copies list VS 874 for Navghan’s accession, allowing him a 42-year reign. He criticized James Tod for counting Chudachandra as the fortieth prince before his time and as the eighth before Jam Unad, who Tod placed in VS 1110, speculating Chudachandra’s reign around VS 960.

===== Rulers and chronology =====
The rulers are listed with Samvat (VS) dates, probable CE dates, and notes on their reigns and relations:

Samvat	Probable date CE	Ruler	Relation	Reign
-	904?	Ra Dyas (Dyachh)	Third descent from Ra Gariyo/Graharipu, grandson of Ra Chandrachud, founder of the Chudasama dynasty	Defeated and killed by Patan king VS 874 (917 CE). Some sources list VS 874 as Navghan's accession date with a 42-year reign.
894	937?	Navaghana (Naughan)	Son of Ra Dyas	Invaded Sindh and defeated Hamir of the Soomra dynasty in VS 890.
916	959?	Khangar	Son of Navaghana	Killed at Bagasara by the Anhilvada Raja, possibly Mularaja, who ruled from 942 to 996 CE.
952	968?	Mularaja	Son of Khangara	Possibly from Anhilvada.
1009	992?	Navaghana II	Son of Mularaja	Ruled for 38 (18?) years.
1078	1021?	Mandalika	Son of Navaghana	Joined Bhima I of Gujarat in pursuit of Mahmud of Ghazni (VS 1080, AH 414).
1095	1038	Hamir Deva	Son of Mandalika	13 years.
1108	1051	Vijaypala	Son of Hamiradeva	-
1162	1085?	Navaghana III	-	Subdued the Raja of Umeta.
-	1107?	Khengar II	-	Slain by Jayasimha Siddharaja of Anhilvada Patan.
1184	1127	Mandalika II	-	11 years.
1195	1138	Alansimha	-	14 years.
1209	1152	Ganesha (Dhanesha)	-	5 years.
1214	1157	Navaghana IV	-	9 years.
1224	1167	Khangara III	-	46 years.
1270	1213	Mandalika III	Son of Khangara III	22 years, mentioned in Girnar inscription.
-	1235?	Navaghana V	-	Omissions of Navghana after Mandalika led to conjectural 10-year reign around Navaghana IV's period.
1302	1245	Mahipaladeva (Ra Kavat)	-	34 years, built a temple at Prabhas, Veraval.
1336	1279	Khangara IV	Son of Mahipaladeva	Repaired Somnath temple, conquered Div, Shams Khan captured Junagadh.
1390	1333	Jayasimhadeva	Son of Khangara IV	11.75 years, subdued 84 petty chiefs.
1402	1345	Mugatsimha (Mokalsimha)	Son of Jayasimha	14 years.
1416	1359	Melak Deva	Son of Mugatsimha	Provided protection to Jhala Krishnaji from Yavana.
1421	1371	Mahipaladeva II (Madhupat)	-	Married Kunta, daughter of Arjuna.
1439	1376	Mandalika IV	Son of Mahipaladeva	Defeated Sangana of Okha.
1450	1393	Jayasimhadeva II	-	Possibly Rai of Jerend, defeated by Muzaffar Shah I in 1411.
1469	1412	Khangara V	-	Engaged in war with Ahmad Shah.
1489	1432	Mandalika V	-	Restored Uparkot (VS 1507), subdued by Mahmud Begada in 1469-70 CE.

===== Post-subjugation as tributary jagirdars =====
After the dynasty was subjugated by the kings of Ahmedabad, it continued as tributary Jagirdars for another century, with the following succession:

Accession CE	Jagirdar	Relation	Reign
1472	Bhupat	Cousin of Mandalika V	32 years.
1503	Khangara VI	Son of Bhupat	22 years.
1524	Navghana VI	Son of Khangara	25 years.
1551	Shrisimha	-	35 years, during Akbar’s conquest of Gujarat.
1585	Khangara VII	-	Ruled until about 1609.

Some versions of the Târikh-i-Soraṭh list additional names without dates.

==== James W. Watson (1884) and Harold Wilberforce-Bell (1916) ====
James W. Watson, in Gazetteer of the Bombay Presidency: Kathiawar Volume VIII (1884), provided a chronology of the Chudasama kings. The early kings' chronology was based on bardic legends, while the later chronology was derived from inscriptions.

In 1916, Harold Wilberforce-Bell published The History of Kathiawad from the Earliest Times. He expanded on Watson's chronology, confirming that the kings starting with Mandalik I were correctly positioned in the chronology, though the dates of accession varied from later chronologies. He presented the following chronology:

Ruler	Accession Start CE	Accession End CE	Notes
Chudachandra	875	907	Founder of the dynasty
Mularaja	907	915	
Vishwavarah	915	940	
Graharipu	940	982	Uparkot fort rebuilt; battle with Chaulukya Mularaja
Kavat	982	1003	Uga Wala tale
Dyas	1003	1010	Battle with Chaulukya Dularaj (Durlabhraja?)
Chaulukya Viceroy	1010	1020	
Navghan	1020	1044	Regained from Chaulukya with help from Ahirs; expedition to Sindh; sack of Somnath in 1026 by Mahmud of Ghazni
Khengar I	1044	1067	23 years
Navghan II	1067	1098	21 years; defeated by Siddharaj
Khengar II	1098	1125	Youngest of four sons of Navghan II; defeated chief of Umeta; broke gate of Analihavad Patan; Siddharaj attacked in return; tale of Ranik Devi
Navghan III	1125	1140	Navghan III regained throne, expelling the Chaulukya viceroy
Kavat II	1140	1152	12 years
Jayasimha/Graharipu II	1152	1180	
Raisimha	1180	1184	
Mahipal II/Gajraj	1184	1201	
Jayamal	1201	1230	
Mahipal III	1230	1253	Battles with Kathis
Khengar III	1253	1260	Subdued Kathis
Mandalik I	1260	1306	Alaf Khan raided Saurashtra; lost Vanthali to Rathod chief
Navghan IV	1306	1308	
Mahipal IV	1308	1325	17 years
Khengar IV	1325	1351	Restored Somnath and expelled the Delhi Sultanate-appointed governor
Jayasimha II	1351	1369	18 years
Mahipal V	1369	1373	Recovered Vanthali in 1370
Muktasimha	1373	1397	Tughluq order to move capital to Vanthali
Mandalika II	1397	1400	3 years
Malek	1400	1415	Brother of Mandalika II; conflict with Ahmad Shah I of Gujarat
Jyasimha III	1415	1440	25 years
Mahipal IV	1440	1451	
Mandalik III	1451	1470	Defeated by Mehmud Begada in 1470 and told to embrace Islam; his descendants restored as Jagirdar
