= Mahipal (disambiguation) =

Mahipal (1919–2005) was an Indian film actor.

Mahipal or Mahipala may also refer to:

- Mahipala I (913–944), Gurjara-Pratihara emperor of the northern Indian subcontinent
- Mahipala (c. 995–1043), Pala king of the eastern Indian subcontinent
- Mahipala II (1070–1075), Pala emperor of the Bengal region of the Indian subcontinent
- Mahipala (c. 1090–1105), king of the Kachchhapaghata dynasty in Gwalior.
- Mahipala I (Chudasama dynasty) (1308–1331), Chudasama king of Saurashtra region of the western Indian subcontinent
- Mahipala II (Chudasama dynasty) (1378–1383), Chudasama king of Saurashtra region of the western Indian subcontinent
- Mahipala III (1430–1451), Chudasama king of Saurashtra region of the western Indian subcontinent
- Mahipal Lomror (born 1999), Indian cricketer
- Mahipal Maderna (born 1952), Indian politician
- Mahipal S. Sachdev, Indian ophthalmologist
