= Girnara Brahmin =

Hindu caste

The Girnara Brahmin are a Hindu caste found in the state of Gujarat in India. They mainly serve as priests at Vaishnav temples. They are of equal status with Sachora Brahmins.

== See also ==
- Sompura Brahmin
