= Keshwada =

Keshwada is a small provincial state near Rajkot, Gujarat, which was one of the many states ruled by Ra Naghan the forefather of the clans of Chudasama, Sarvaiya, and Raijada.
