= Sompura Brahmin =

The Sompura Brahmin are a Hindu caste found in the states of Gujarat and Rajasthan in India. They are a sub-group of the Brahmin community and descendants of Vishvakarma also related to Sompura Salat

== History and origin ==
According to their traditions, the Sompura Brahmins derive their name from the god Chandra, who is believed to have created them to perform rituals known as Som Yajna for the god Shiva. The community is primarily concentrated in the town of Prabhas Patan and is considered one of the oldest Brahmin groups in Gujarat. They speak the Gujarati.

The Skanda Purana (chapters 21–24) contains references to the origin of the Sompura Brahmins. According to this account, Agnihotri Brahmins from Chandra Lok (the realm of the moon god) accompanied Hemgarbha, the chief secretary of Chandra, to Prabhas to perform a pratishtha yajna (installation ceremony) for the first temple of Somnath. After the completion of the ritual, Chandra requested these Brahmins to remain there, and they settled near the Somnath temple.

== Present circumstances ==
Like other Brahmin communities, they are organized into exogamous gotras. The Sompuras have 18 gotras; eleven of these are found across Gujarat and Rajasthan and are associated with temple architecture based on Shilpa Shastra. The remaining seven gotras are primarily located near Prabhas Patan, and their traditional occupation is yajman vrutti (priestly services) in temples, particularly in and around Somnath. Members of the community serve as priests at the Somnath temple. The community also observes vegetarianism.

== See also ==
- Sachora Brahmin
- Sompura Salat
