= Mokalasimha =

Ra of Saurashtra (reign: 1384-1396 CE)

- Ra of Saurashtra
- Reign: 1384–1396 CE
- Predecessor: Mahipala II
- Successor: Mandalika II
Era name and dates
- Vikram Samvat: 1440–1452
- Dynasty: Chudasama dynasty
- Father: Jayasimha I
- Religion: Hinduism

Ra Mokalasimha, also known as Muktasimha, was a Chudasama king of Saurashtra region of western India who reigned from 1384 CE to 1396 CE (VS 1440 to VS 1452). He ruled from Junagadh and later moved his capital to Vanthali when Saurashtra came under influence of the Delhi Sultanate.

== Reign ==
Mokalasimha succeeded his brother Mahipati-Mahipala II. The Dhandhusar inscription mentions that he had defeated the kings of Kutch (probably Jadeja king) and Sindh at Bhubritapalli (now Ghumli). It further adds that he had moved the capital from Junagadh to Vanthali following the order from the Governor of Gujarat on behalf of Delhi Sultan Firuz Shah Tughluq who placed a thanadar in Junagadh. The Sultan is mentioned as Patasahiprabhu. In 1394 CE, Governor of Gujarat Zafar Khan (later Muzaffar Shah I who founded Gujarat Sultanate) marched with a large army into the peninsula and attacked Vanthali. Mokalasimha had to surrendered and pay a heavy tribute. During his reign, the Somnath temple was attacked by Zafar Khan in 1395 CE. He was succeeded by his son Mandalika II in 1397 CE.

The Dhandhusar inscription (VS 1445/1389 CE) in Hani Vav, a stepwell at Dhandhusar, mentions that it was built by Hani, wife of Vaijayanath who had served as Mokalasimha's minister at young age succeeding his father Gadadhar. An inscription on paliya (VS 1447/1391 CE) in Avania near Maliya Hatina mentions the region was under the Delhi Sultanate. He is also mentioned an inscription on paliya at Mesavana (VS 1444/1387 CE), Sil Bagasara (VS 1448/1392 CE), Goreja (VS 1450/1393 CE). The inscription on paliya (VS 1450/1393 CE) in Nagnath temple in Chorwad mentions that it was under Shivaraja (Shivagana) of Prabhas Patan.

He is also mentioned in genealogy in inscriptions at Revati Kund near Damodar Kund, Junagadh (VS 1472/1417 CE) and at Neminath Temple (c. VS 1510/c. 1454 CE) on Girnar.

He was succeeded by his son Mandalika II in 1396 CE.
