= Sompura Salat =

Hindu artisan caste

Sompura Salat Brahmin are a Hindu Brahmin stone-worker community of Gujarat, They are also found in southern Rajasthan, specially in the Mewar region. Their origin is said to be from Prabhas Patan famous for the Somnath temple and descendants of Vishwakarma. The term "salat" is derived from Shilavat, the old term for a temple architect. They are party of Sompura Brahmin community only but with focus on architecture.

== Culture ==
Members of this clan took up artistic and masonry works as their occupation. They maintain clan exogamy as a strict rule for marriage.

The community is vegetarian in diet and also avoids eating onions, garlic, white cucumber and lentils. They worship Ashapura Mata as their clan deity. They are a Shivaite community and worship Shiva as chief deity. They, however, also observe many Hindu festivals like Uthasini, Ramanavami, Janamashtmi, Holi, Diwali while Shivaratri and Navaratri are the main festivals for the community.

== Occupation ==
They are specialized in temple masonry works, artistic carvings and sculpting as well as artistic stone shaping works, especially in works of idol-making. Among the notable architecture built by them are Hawa Mahal, the royal palace near Wadhwan built for the Sultanate of Gujarat and more recently the Somnath Temple built after independence of India.

== Demography ==
The community is found throughout Gujarat but largely are concentrated in Saurashtra region. Outside India, their population is found in United Kingdom and United States of America.

== Restoration and building of temples ==
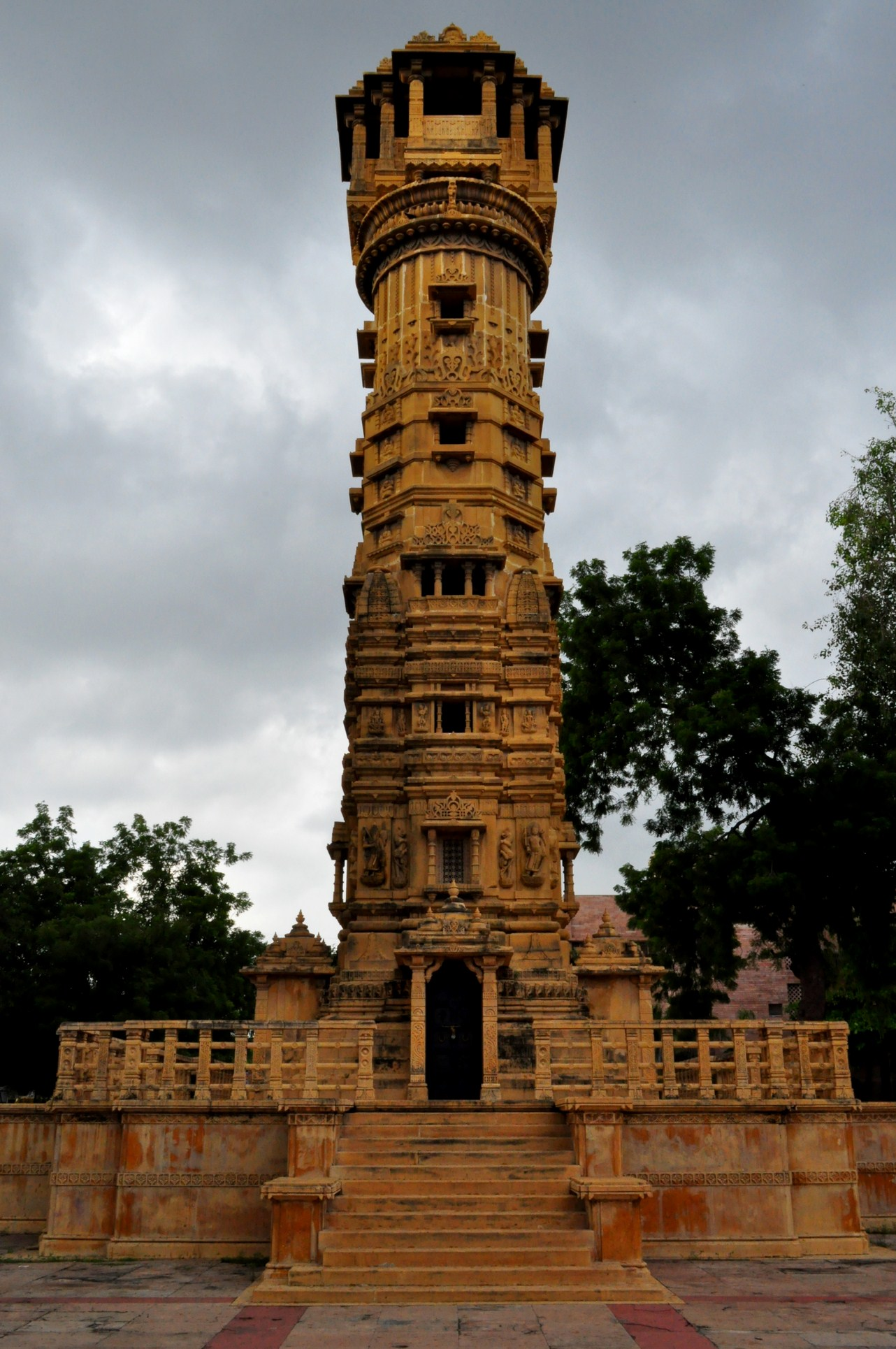
Manasthambha in front of Hutheesing Jain Temple

Prabhashankar Oghadbhai of Palitana had been one of the leading designers of Nagar style of temples. He was awarded the Padmashri by the Government of India. The design and building of the modern Somnath Temple, known as Somnath Maha Meru Prasad, was executed by him.

While their center of activity is in Gujarat and Rajasthan, they now undertake temple architecture in different parts of India, as well as overseas. They follow texts written in the 15th century such as Prasad Manjari, written during the rule of Rana Raimal by brothers Mandan and Nathji. They originally hailed from Patan, Gujarat and were invited to settle in Chittorgarh. During the past five centuries, they have been involved in building and restoration of numerous Jain temples in Gujarat and southern Rajasthan, as well as temples built by Jains in other parts of India.

In 1992, Chandrakant Sompura, grandson of Prabhashankar had designed the Sompura Akshardham temple in Gandhinagar. He was asked by Ashok Singhal, chief of the Vishwa Hindu Parishad, to design and build the Ram Janmabhoomi temple. He was the chief architect of Ayodhya Ram Mandir and was assisted by his sons, Ashish and Nikhil.

The world's largest Ram Temple, a proposed replica of Angkor Wat to be built in Champaran, Bihar, is being designed by Piyush Sompura.

C.P. Trivedi and Sons, founded by Chandulal P. Trivedi from the Sompura clan, were responsible for the restoration of the Delwara Jain temples, the Jain temples at Jaisalmer Fort and the Amar Sagar Lake. They also designed the Kirti Stumbh at Hutheesing Wadi in Ahmedabad, Oswal Jain Temple in Nairobi, Kenya, Jain Center, Leicester, UK, Atma Vallabh Smarak, Delhi, and the Global Vipassana Pagoda at Gorai in northwest Mumbai.

Virendra Trivedi, nephew of Chandulal Trivedi, also participated on the Global Vipassana Pagoda project, but is best known for being the chief architect responsible for the Akshardham temple in New Delhi.

Dhiren Sompura, the owner of Devalaya Art is responsible for the Famous 108 Feet Statue Of Buddha, Hisua Village - Bihar, Dham Temple, Mahadev Dhari-Pali, Mahadev Dhari-Pali. He has also created fine architectural structures with detailed stone carving work.
