= Khengara =

Ra of Saurashtra (reign: 1331-1351 CE)

- Ra of Saurashtra
- Reign: 1331–1351 CE
- Predecessor: Mahipala I
- Successor: Jayasimha I
- Issue: Jayasimha I
Era name and dates
- Vikram Samvat: 1387–1407
- Dynasty: Chudasama dynasty
- Father: Mahipala I
- Religion: Hinduism

Khengara (Note: Older chronology mentions him as Khengara IV.) was a Chudasama king of Saurashtra region of western India who reigned from 1331 CE to 1351 CE (VS 1387 to VS 1407). His capital was at Junagadh.

== Reign ==
Khengara succeeded his father Mahipala I in 1331 CE. He expelled the Muslim governors from Somnath and Prabhas Patan and restored decayed Somnath temple.

A cobbler named Taghan or Tagi, who had been raised to power in Gujarat, raised a rebellion amongst the nobles against the governor appointed by Delhi Sultan Muhammad bin Tughluq. Tughluq marched with an army on Anhilawada Patan to restore order, and Taghan fled to Junagadh and sought protection from Khengara. In 1350 CE (HS 760/VS 1406), Tughluq again led an army against Junagadh, besieged the fort for two rainy seasons and eventually captured it. In this battle, Vaghela Vir, a devoted adherent of Khengara, was slain. Khengara was imprisoned and however soon released. But Taghan fled to Sindh. Tughluq, after subduing the coastal town and several petty chiefs, spent rainy season at Gondal where he became ill with fever. After rains were over, Tughluq went to Sindh but his health worsened and he died at Thatta in Sindh in 1351 CE.

Revati Kund inscription mentions that he had conquered the eighteen islands on the coast and was a great patron of music. He is said in the Mandalika Kavya to have subdued eighty four minor chieftains, Jhalas and Gohils included, though Mandalika Kavya is not historically reliable source.

Khengara died in 1351 CE and was succeeded by his son Jayasimha I.

He is mentioned in the inscription (VS 1402/1346 CE) incised on the pedestal of Chaturvinshati Jinapatta (the 24 Tirthankara display) at Mangrol which says his minister named Jhajha had caused this Jinapatta to be made at Girnar. He is also mentioned in genealogy in inscriptions at Revati Kund near Damodar Kund, Junagadh (VS 1472/1417 CE); at the Hanivav, Dhandhusar (VS 1445/1389 CE); and at Neminath Temple (c. VS 1510/c. 1454 CE) on Girnar.
