= Jayasimha I (Chudasama dynasty) =

Ra of Saurashtra (reign: 1351-1378 CE)

- Ra of Saurashtra
- Reign: 1351–1378 CE
- Predecessor: Khengara
- Successor: Mahipala II
- Issue: Mahipala II, Satyaraja, Mokalasimha
Era name and dates
- Vikram Samvat: 1407–1435
- Dynasty: Chudasama dynasty
- Father: Khengara
- Religion: Hinduism

Jayasimha I (Note: Older chronology mentions him as Jayasimha II.) was a Chudasama king of Saurashtra region of western India who reigned from 1351 CE to 1378 CE (VS 1407 to VS 1435). His capital was at Junagadh.

== Reign ==
Jayasimha I succeeded his father Khengara in 1351 CE. He is said in the Mandalika Kavya to have been victorious over his enemies but Mandalika Kavya is unreliable source. Delhi Sultan Muhammad bin Tughluq was succeeded by Firuz Shah Tughlaq when he died in 1351 CE. The country around Somnath and the sea-coast of Sorath continued to be under Delhi Sultanate but the Sultanate was weakened. Taking advantage of the situation, Jayasimha expelled Muslim thanadars appointed by the Sultanate from the region. Firuz Shah Tughluq's governor of Gujarat, Zafar Khan Farasi send an army. His commander Shams Khan defeated Jayasimha and appointed a thanadar.

He is mentioned in the inscription (VS 1434/1377 CE) on paliya at Nagichana near Mangrol. So he must have regained the power. The paliya inscription (VS 1435/1378 CE) at Osa near Junagadh mentions that Junagadh was under ''thanadar'' named Mahamalik Muhammad Sadik and Raval Mahipaladeva. Jayasimha was succeeded by his son, Mahipala II. So he must have died in 1378 CE. His other sons were Satyaraja; mentioned in Sudavav inscription (VS 1437/1381 CE) at Mahuva, Bhavnagar; and Mokalasimha who succeeded Mahipala II.

Zafar Khan Farsi's another commander Malek Izzuddin Yahya attacked and defeated Mangrol chief Thakor Kumarapala died in the battle. Mangrol fell under the Sultanate (1368 CE).
