= Mandalika I =

Chudasama king of Saurashtra (reign: 1294-1306 CE)

- Ra of Saurashtra
- Reign: 1294–1306 CE
- Successor: Navaghana
- Issue: Rupa, Navaghana, Mahipala I (Note: Navaghana and Mahipala are also mentioned as father and son.)
Era name and dates
- Vikram Samvat: 1350–1362
- Dynasty: Chudasama dynasty
- Father: Yashodhavala
- Mother: Priyamaladevi
- Religion: Hinduism

Mandalika I was a Chudasama King of Saurashtra region of western India who reigned from 1294 CE to 1306 CE (VS 1350 to VS 1362). His capital was at Junagadh.

== Reign ==
The inscription found at Hatasni (VS 1386/1329 CE, now at Bhavnagar Museum) mentions Somavanshi (Chandravanshi) royal family in which a king named Shangara (Khangara) was born. In Shanagra's family, a Yashodhavala was born who was later married to Priyamaladevi of Suryavanshi family. They had three sons; Malla, Mandala (Mandalika) and Meliga. The inscription further mentions an ally Vakhala family of Mehar race who were under Mandalika and later under Mahisha which are identified as Mandalika I and his son Mahipala I respectively. Mandalika's daughter Rupa was married in Vakhala family, a Mer dynasty based in Talaja.

The undated fragmentary inscription recovered from Adishwara Mahadeva temple in Adpokar mentions death of Kanhaddeva, fighting for king Vayajaladeva, in battle with army of Ranaka Mandalika. The Sutrapada inscription dated VS 1357 mentions Vayajaladeva so this inscription belongs to the same period and the mentioned king must be Mandalika I, living from VS 1316 to VS 1362.

During Mandalika I's reign, in 1299 CE, Gujarat was conquered by Ulugh Khan and Nusrat Khan Jalesari, the generals of Delhi Sultan Alauddin Khalji. Ulugh Khan also destroyed Somnath temple which had been rebuilt since the time of destruction by Mahmud of Ghazni in the 11th century. He also conquered the sea coast of the peninsula from Ghogha to Madhavapur. On this occasion, Mandalika is said to have defeated a division of his troops but possibly he may have defeated one of the governors of the sea coast left by Ulugh Khan. The Revati Kund inscription near Damodar Kund, Junagadh (VS 1472/1417 CE) mentions him as conqueror of the Mudgalas (Muslims). The inscription at the Neminath Temple (c. VS 1510/c. 1454 CE) on Girnar mentions that he gilded the temple. Mandalika I was succeeded by his son Navaghana.
