= Raijada (caste) =

Raijada or Raizada are one of the Yaduvanshi Rajput clans. They are an off-shoot of Chudasama Rajputs.The name Raijada was adopted by one Bhupatsinh, son of Ra' Mandlik, who was given jagir of Sorath. He was entrusted with collecting revenue and taxes by Sultan Mahmud Begada and was given extensive jagirs around Sil and Bagasara He adopted new surname Raijada from Chudasama hence his descandants are known as Raijada.

The Chudasama Raijada, Jadeja, Jadaun, Bhati, Sarvaiya and consider themselves brothers, as they are off-shoot of branches from Samaas, so they do not intermarry, as per their Rajput traditions. Until independence of India, they held extensive Jagirs near Keshod and Chorwad in Sorath. Jhala Rajputs have inter-marraige relations with Raijada Rajput clans
