= Navaghana =

- Rao of Saurashtra
- Reign: 1306–1308 CE
- Predecessor: Mandalika I
- Successor: Mahipala I
Era name and dates
- Vikram Samvat: 1362–1364
- Dynasty: Chudasama dynasty
- Father: Mandalika I
- Religion: Hinduism

Navaghana (Note: Older chronology mentions him as Navaghana IV.) was a Chudasama king of Saurashtra region of western India who reigned from 1306 CE to 1308 CE (VS 1362 to VS 1364). His capital was at Junagadh.

== Reign ==
Navaghana was middle aged when he succeeded his father Mandalika I. He is mentioned in the inscriptions of Neminath Temple (c. VS 1510 or 1454 CE) on Girnar where he is remembered as a mighty warrior. During his short reign of two years, he had installed Shivalinga in the Somanatha temple which was destroyed during reign of his father. He probably died in a local conflict with Muslims in 1308 CE. He was succeeded by his younger brother (although the Girnar inscription says his "son"), Mahipala I. (Note: Although the Girnar inscription says "son", according to D. B. Diskalkar, Navaghana was actually Mahipala I's older brother, not his father.)
