= The Proclamation of the Gates =

1842 order by the Governor-General of British India

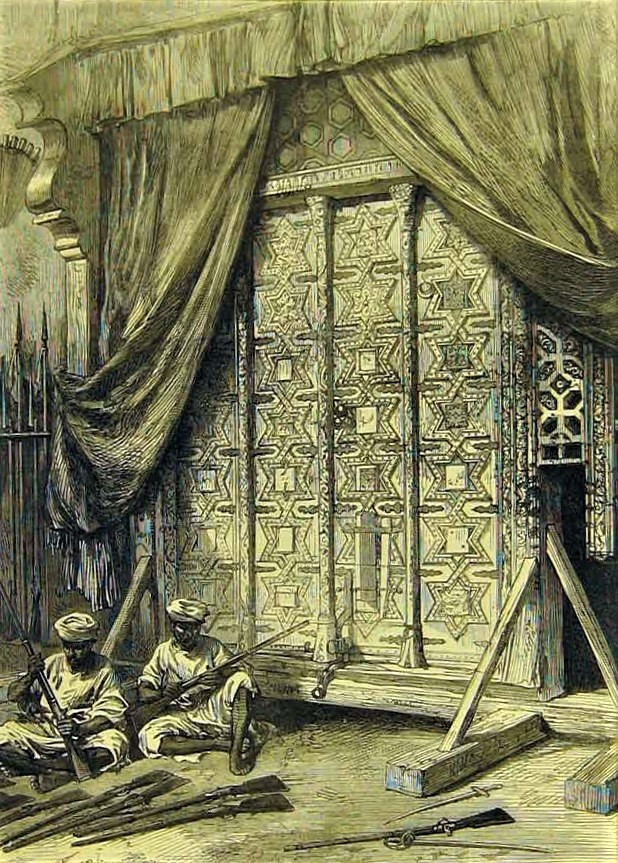
The Gates from the tomb of Mahmud of Ghazni stored in the Arsenal of Agra Fort – Illustrated London News, 1872

The Proclamation of the Gates was an order issued in 1842 by Lord Ellenborough, then the Governor-General of Britain's territories in India, during the Battle of Kabul. This order demanded that the troops to bring back gates from Ghazni that Mahmud allegedly took after his destruction of the Somnath temple some 800 years earlier and had it installed as the doors of his mausoleum. This allegation was later found to be false. The basis for the order are unclear, as neither Turko-Persian sources nor Indic sources mention any such gates. According to Romila Thapar, "if there were any gates at all" anywhere, they "might have been some fort gates". The order, states Thapar, is best seen as an example of how "colonial intervention in India" was viewed in the 1840s, or possibly a demand from the Sikh emperor Ranjit Singh for helping the British in their Kabul campaign.

== Description ==
In 1842, Edward Law, 1st Earl of Ellenborough issued his Proclamation of the Gates, in which he ordered the British army in Afghanistan to return via Ghazni and bring back to India the sandalwood gates from the tomb of Mahmud of Ghazni in Ghazni, Afghanistan. These were believed to have been taken by Mahmud from Somnath. Under Ellenborough's instruction, General William Nott removed the gates in September 1842. A whole sepoy regiment, the 6th Jat Light Infantry, was detailed to carry the gates back to India.

On arrival, the gates were found not to be of Gujarati or Indian design, and not of Sandalwood, but of Deodar wood (native to Ghazni) and therefore not authentic to Somnath. They were placed in the arsenal store-room of the Agra Fort where they still lie to the present day. There was a debate in the House of Commons in London in 1843 on the question of the gates of the temple and Ellenbourough's role in the affair. After much crossfire between the British Government and the opposition, all of the facts as we know them were laid out.

== Legacy ==
In the 19th century novel The Moonstone by Wilkie Collins, the diamond of the title is presumed to have been stolen from the temple at Somnath and, according to the historian Romila Thapar, reflects the interest aroused in Britain by the gates.
