= Bagasara-Ghed =

Village in Junagadh, Gujarat, India

Bagasara-Ghed, also known as Bagasara (Sil), is a village in Mangarol Taluka of Junagadh district, Gujarat, India. Bagasra-Ghed lies thirty-four miles to the south-west of Junagadh.

== History ==
It appears from the inscription in the temple of the Koteshvar Mahadev at Kodinar that in 1272 (Samvat 1328) this village was under the rule of Visaladeva, the Vaghela king of Anhilwad Patan, the then lord paramount of Gujarat, and that he granted it to a dependent of his named Nana, a Nagar Brahmin, who also held a seventh share in the revenue of Mangrol.

There is a paliya (memorial stone) in the grain-yard at Bagasara dated 1392 (Samvat 1448) from which it seems that Pato, son of Samo, was slain in battle at Bagasara in the victorious reign of Mokalasimha, the Chudasama ruler of Junagadh. Later paliyas bear the names of the Sultans of Gujarat Sultanate of Ahmedabad as being lords-paramount here. All these paliyas bear the name Bagasara. Afterwards in 1472 (Samvat 1528), the Bagasra Chovisi was granted in jagir to Bhupatsingh, son of Mandalika III, the last Chudasama ruler of Junagadh. The descendants of this Bhupatsingh, who are called Raizadas, are still living in certain villages near Keshod.

It was a subdivision under Sil mahal during British period.

== Agriculture ==
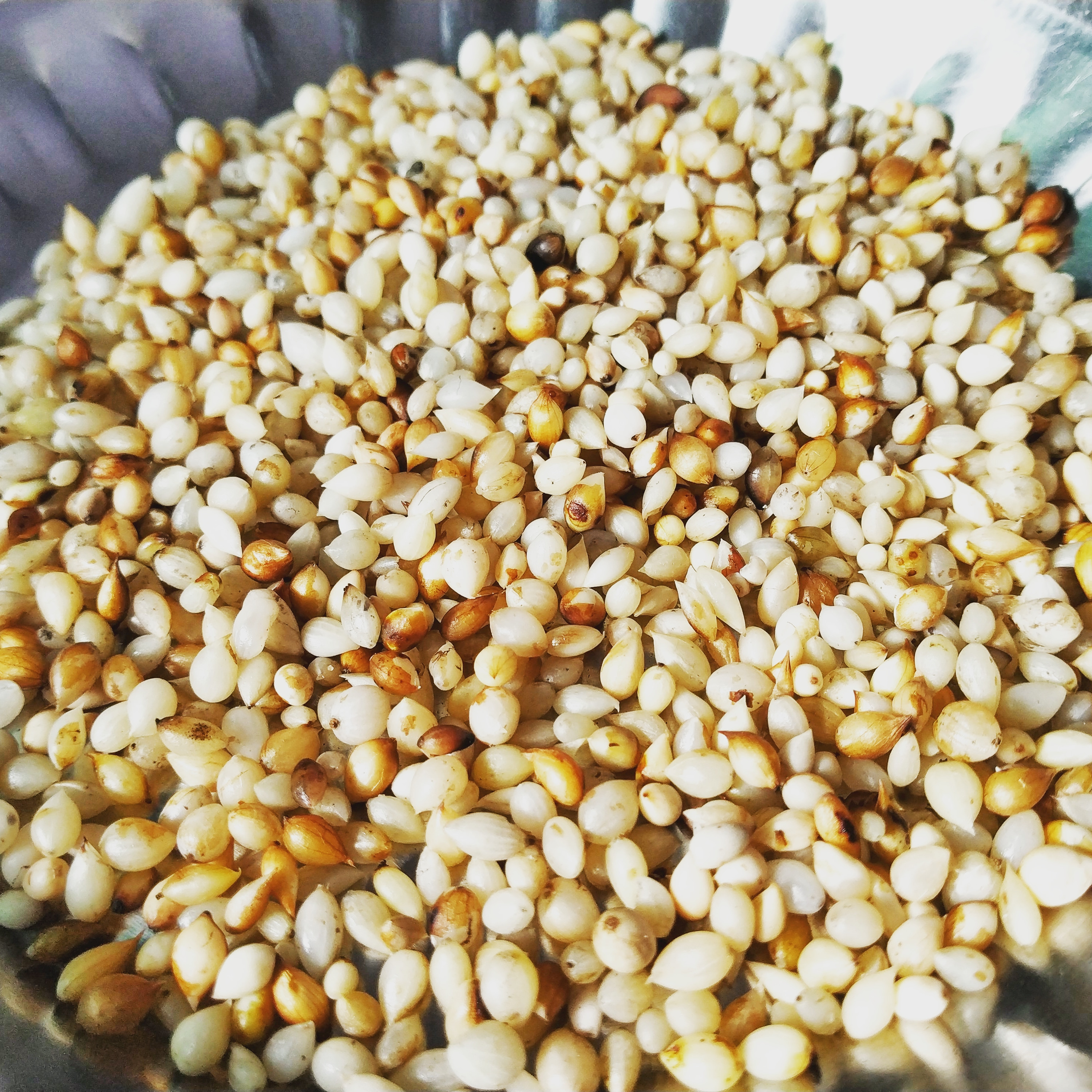
Thegi or Thek

The village lands form part of the huge marsh called the Ghed and are inundated in the rainy season. Kase grass grows spontaneously in the Ghed; the green grass is cut and given to cattle to eat; when the grass seeds, the seed or grain is collected and called kasaiya and is eaten by the residents of the Ghed villages. As it is not considered a grain it is eaten by Hindus on fast days. This grass has bulbous roots and the bulbs are black and the size of small potatoes. They are also cut up and the husk removed and then boiled and eaten. These bulbs are called lodh when green and bid when dry. Thegi or Thek, Cyperus jemenicus, a sedge, is also found in the Ghed, and in the, sand hills on tho sea coast. There are thousands of lotus plants in the Ghed. The pods of the lotus are called kumnas and they contain small white seeds which are made into bread and eaten by the poorer classes and also by the rich on fast days. The gram grown in the Ghed is specially famous both for its excellent flavour, and because it is very easily cooked. It is called Ghedia chana or Ghedia gram.

== Demographics ==
The population of Bagasara consists chiefly of Mers, Ghedia Kolis, Memons, Khojas, Lohanas, Girnar Brahmins, and Sindhis.
