= Mandalika II =

- Ra of Saurashtra
- Reign: 1396–1400 CE
- Predecessor: Mokalasimha
- Successor: Meliga
Era name and dates
- Vikram Samvat: 1452–1456
- Dynasty: Chudasama dynasty
- Father: Mokalasimha
- Religion: Hinduism

Ra Mandalika II was a Chudasama king of Saurashtra region of western India who reigned from 1396 CE to 1400 CE (VS 1452 to VS 1456).

== Reign ==
Mandalika succeeded his father Mokalasimha in 1396 CE at elder age. He remained at Vanthali and died in 1400 and was succeeded by his brother Meliga.

He is also mentioned in genealogy of Revati Kund near Damodar Kund, Junagadh (VS 1472/1417 CE).
