= Sachora Brahmin =

Hindu caste

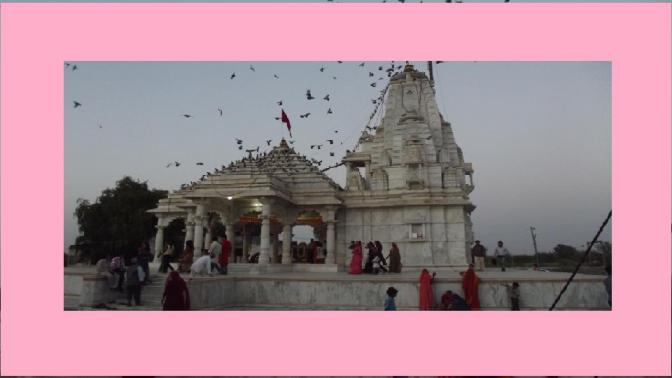
This is the photograph of Sati Dakshayani Mandir based at Sanchor, Rajasthan.

The Sachora Brahmin are a Brahmin community found in Gujarat, India. They originate from Sanchore in Rajasthan.

They are mainly agriculturalists. They also occupy an important position in facilitating worship in the Vallabha Sampradāya where they prepare food for the svarūpas.

== See also ==
- Sompura Brahmin
