= Ranchhodji Diwan =

Gujarati author and government minister

Raṇchoḍjī Amarjī (1768—1841) was an author and the chief minister (diwan) of Junagadh state under the Babi dynasty.

== Life ==
Ranchhodji was a son of Amarji Diwan, the chief minister of Junagadh state. Upon death of his father, he was appointed the chief minister. Although a Nagar Brahmin by caste, he had mastered the profession of arms. He had fought battles with states of Jamnagar and Cutch. In 1805, British agent Colonel Walker met Nawab of Junagadh state and it became British protectorate under East India Company in 1807. Thus Ranchhodji retired from battlefields and started writing poetry. He assisted the state in abolishing the practices of Sati and female infanticide. He was a follower of Shakti. Like some other natives of Junagadh, he had contracted a dislike of Pushtimarg, the Vallabh form of Vaishnavism, and he went so far as not to name any member of his family with a name which would have even a remote tinge of that cult. However, when he installed the liṅgam of Budheśvar, he ordered the worship of the deity to be the done in the same fashion as the Puṣṭimārga sevā rituals.

Many allusions have been made to him by English writers like John Malcolm and Mariana Postans. In Blackwood's Magazine, the mention is made of his qualities. Postans, who saw him reposing under a vine-clad bower surrounded by a number of amanuenses, sitting on Persian carpets, says that,

...his large black eyes lustrous as burning lamps, were illumined by the fire of intellect within, and he was an acknowledged patron of poets, men of science and literary genius.

— Mariana Poshtans, Western India in 1838, Volume II, p. 126

== Works ==
Ranchhodji knew Gujarati, Sanskrit and Persian languages. In Persian he has written the Tarikh-i-Sorath va Halar, a history of Sorath and also the Rukat-i-Gunagun (various letters). He has translated into Braj Bhasha, a work called the Sivarahasya, besides a number of other works. In Gujarati, he has also written about a dozen works, chief among them being the Ramayana Ramvalla, Shivagita and Chandipath or Chandipath na Garba. Chandipath is Gujarati version of a rhapsody, Durga Saptashati, narrating the forms and adventures of the goddess Shakti.

== See also ==
- List of Gujarati-language writers
