= Mahipala II (Chudasama dynasty) =

Ra of Saurashtra (reign: 1378-1384 CE)

- Ra of Saurashtra
- Reign: 1378–1384 CE
- Predecessor: Jayasimha I
- Successor: Mokalasimha
Era name and dates
- Vikram Samvat: 1435–1440
- Dynasty: Chudasama dynasty
- Father: Jayasimha I
- Religion: Hinduism

Raul Mahipala II (Note: Older chronology mentions him as Mahipala V.) was a Chudasama king of Saurashtra region of western India who reigned from 1378 CE to 1384 CE (VS 1435 to VS 1440).

== Reign ==
Mahipala II succeeded his father Jayasimha I.

The paliya inscription (VS 1435/1378 CE) at Osa near Junagadh mentions that Junagadh was under thanadar named Mahamalik Muhammad Sadik and Raul Mahipaladeva. So it seems that Junagadh was ruled by thanadar under governor of Gujarat. At the time of this inscription, Farhat-ul-Mulk Rasti Khan was governor of Gujarat who was under Delhi Sultan Firuz Shah Tughlaq. The inscription (VS 1437/1381 CE) in Sudavav, a stepwell in Mahuva, Bhavnagar mentions Mahipala and his another younger brother Satyaraja.

He recovered Vanthali from Amarsingh and Jetsingh, the descendants of Jagatsingh.

Mahipala II was succeeded by his brother Mokalasimha, also known as Muktasimha in 1384 CE.
