= Mahipala I (Chudasama dynasty) =

Ra of Saurashtra (reign: 1308-1331 CE)

- Rao of Saurashtra
- Reign: 1308–1331 CE
- Predecessor: Navaghana
- Successor: Khengara
- Issue: Khengara
Era name and dates
- Vikram Samvat: 1364–1387
- Dynasty: Chudasama dynasty
- Father: Navaghana
- Religion: Hinduism

Mahipala I (Note: Older chronology mentions him as Mahipala IV.) was a Chudasama king of Saurashtra region of western India who reigned from 1308 CE to 1331 CE (VS 1364 to VS 1387). (Note: His rule ended in 1325 according to Parikh. But there is an inscription dated 1329 CE in Hatansi inscription, now Bhavnagar Museum.) His capital was at Junagadh.

== Reign ==
Mahipala succeeded his father (Note: Navaghana is also mentioned as Mahipala's brother.) Navaghana and repaired the Somnath temple which his father could not do and gave much money for religious uses. It is known that, at least till 1301, Vayajaladeva of Vaja dynasty was a local ruler of Prabhas Patan where Somanath temple is situated. So he must have defeated Muslim administrator with his cooperation and repaired the temple. He was succeeded by his son Khengara.

== Inscriptions ==
He is mentioned in the inscriptions in Sodhali Vav, a stepwell in Mangrol (VS 1375/1319 CE); on the stone slab found from Hatansi, now in Bhavnagar Museum (VS 1387/1329 CE); at Jain temple on Girnar hill (date missing); and there is an inscription dated VS 1371 (1315 CE), likely from Shatrunjaya hill, commemorating the installation of an image in the Śatruṃjaya Ādinātha temple of the rāṇaka (vassal king) Mahīpāla, who is probably identical to Mahipala I. He is also mentioned in the genealogy in inscriptions at Revati Kund near Damodar Kund, Junagadh (VS 1472/1417 CE) and at Neminath Temple (c. VS 1510/c. 1454 CE) on Girnar.
