= Somnath Temple =

Hindu temple in Gujarat, India

- Somanath Jyotirlinga
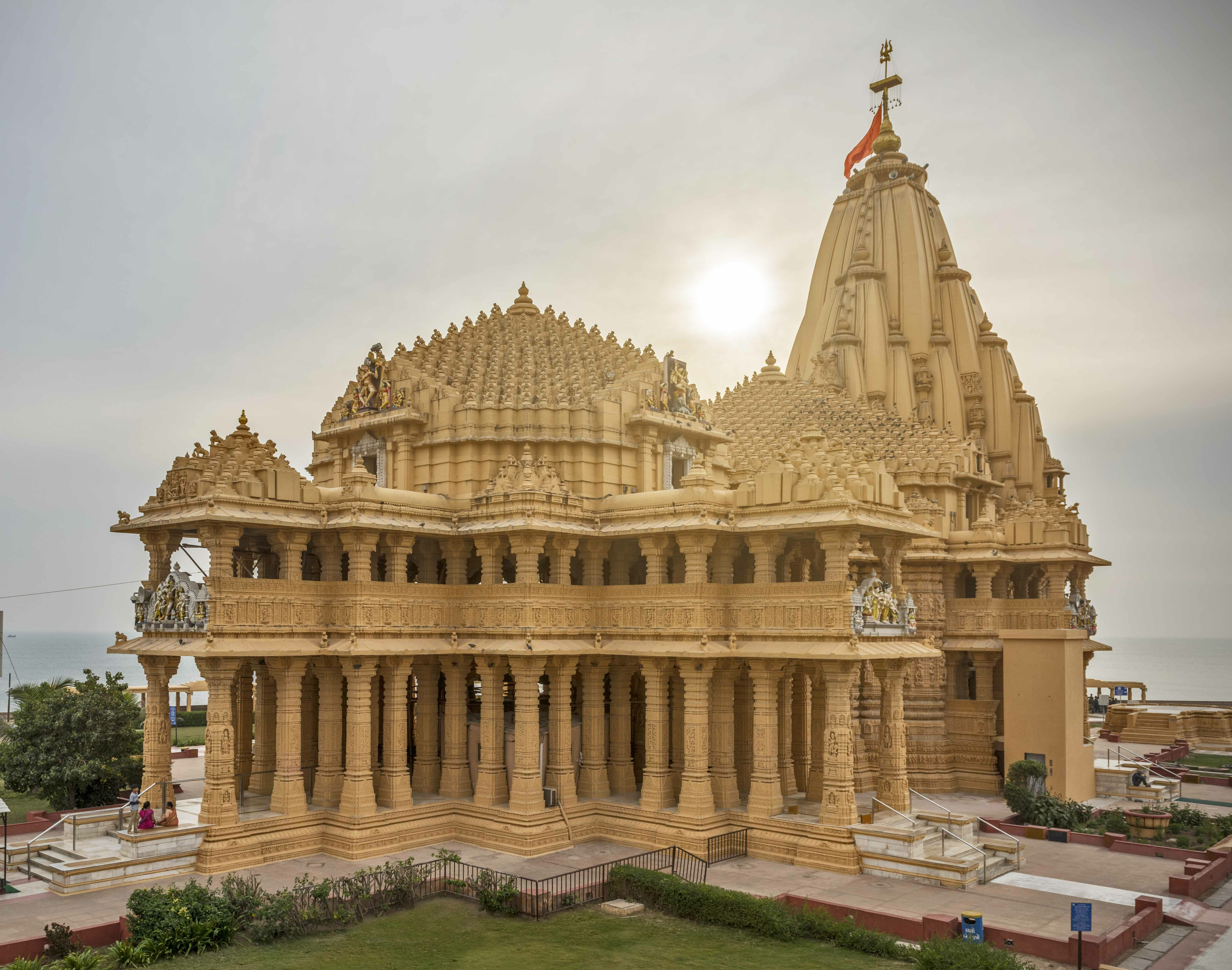

- Location within Gujarat Location within India

Religion
- Affiliation: Hinduism
- District: Gir Somnath
- Deity: Shiva
- Governing body: Shree Somnath Trust

Location
- Location: Veraval
- State: Gujarat
- Country: India
- Coordinates: 20°53′16.9″N 70°24′5.0″E

Architecture
- Creator: Unknown - by Unknown (Many constructions); 1169 - by Kumarapala; 1308 - by Mahipal I; 1950 - by The Somnath Trust (Present structure)
- Completed: 1951
- Demolished: 1026 by Mahmud of Ghazni; 1299 by Ulugh Khan; 1395 by Muzaffar Shah I; 1706 by Aurangzeb

Website
- somnath.org

Somanatha Temple (Sanskrit: सोमनाथ, romanized: Somanātha, lit. Soma = moon nātha = lord/master ) is a Hindu temple, located in Prabhas Patan, Veraval, in Gujarat, India. It is one of the most sacred pilgrimage sites, or Tirtha Kshetra for Hindus and is the first among the twelve jyotirlinga shrines of Shiva. The date of construction of the earliest Somnath temple remains uncertain, with estimates varying between the early centuries of the 1st millennium and about the 9th century CE. Various texts, including the Mahabharata and Bhagavata Purana, mention a tirtha (pilgrimage site) at Prabhas Patan on the coastline of Saurashtra, where the later temple would eventually be built, but archaeology has not found traces of an early temple, though there was a settlement there.

The temple was reconstructed several times in the past after repeated destruction by multiple Muslim invaders and rulers, notably starting with an attack by Mahmud Ghazni in January 1026.

In the late 19th and early 20th centuries, historians and archaeologists of the colonial era actively studied the Somnath temple because its ruins showed a historic Hindu temple that was turning into an Islamic mosque. After India's independence, those ruins were demolished, and the present Somnath temple was reconstructed in the Māru-Gurjara style of Hindu temple architecture. The contemporary Somnath temple's reconstruction was started under the orders of the first Deputy Prime Minister of India, Vallabhbhai Patel, after receiving approval for reconstruction from Mahatma Gandhi. The reconstruction was completed in May 1951, after Gandhi's death.

== Location ==
The Somnath temple is located along the coastline in Veraval, Saurashtra region of Gujarat. It is about 400 kilometres (249 mi) southwest of Ahmedabad, 82 kilometres (51 mi) south of Junagadh – another major archaeological and pilgrimage site in Gujarat. It is about 7 kilometres (4 mi) southeast of the Veraval Junction railway station, about 2.7 kilometres (2 mi) east of Veraval port, about 2.5 kilometres (1.6 mi) south of Somnath Terminus railway station, about 57 kilometres (35 mi) south of the Keshod Airport and about 85 kilometres (53 mi) west of the Diu airport.

The Somnath temple is located eastward to the Veraval port, one of the three ancient trading ports in Gujarat from where Indian merchants departed to trade goods. The 11th-century Persian historian Al-Biruni states that Somnath has become so famous because "it was the harbor for seafaring people and a station for those who went to and fro between Sufala in the country of Zanj (east Africa) and China". Combined with its repute as an eminent pilgrimage site, its location was well known to the kingdoms within the Indian subcontinent. Literature and epigraphical evidence suggest that the medieval-era Veraval port was also actively trading with the Middle East and Southeast Asia. This brought wealth and fame to the city as well as to the temple.

The site of Somnath was occupied during the Indus Valley Civilisation, 2000–1200 BCE. It was one of very few sites in the Junagadh district to be so occupied. After abandonment in 1200 BCE, it was reoccupied in 400 BCE and continued into the historical period. Prabhas is also close to the other sites similarly occupied: Junagadh, Dwarka, Padri and Bharuch.

== Nomenclature and significance ==
Somnath means "Lord of the Soma" or "moon". (Note: In anthropomorphic representations, a crescent of the moon is shown near Shiva's jata-mukuta (hair). This iconography appears in early texts and temples dated to the 6th-century.) The site is also called Prabhasa ("place of splendor"). Somnath temple has been a jyotirlinga site for the Hindus, and a holy place of pilgrimage (tirtha). It is one of five most revered sites on the seacoast of India, along with the nearby Dwaraka in Gujarat, Puri in Odisha, Rameswaram and Chidambaram in Tamil Nadu.

== Scriptural mentions ==
Many Hindu texts provide a list of the most sacred Shiva pilgrimage sites, along with a guide for visiting the site. The best known were the Mahatmya genre of texts. Of these, Somnatha temple tops the list of jyotirlingas in the Jnanasamhita – chapter 13 of the Shiva Purana, and the oldest known text with a list of jyotirlingas. Other texts include the Varanasi Mahatmya (found in Skanda Purana), the Shatarudra Samhita and the Kothirudra Samhita. (Note: In 2007, Fleming dated the Jnanasamhita to the 10th century, while he suggests a 12th-century date in 2009. Others such as Hazra, Rocher suggest late 10th-century.) All either directly mention the Somnath temple as the number one of twelve sites, or call the top temple as "Somesvara" in Saurashtra – a synonymous term for this site in these texts. (Note: In addition to the one at Somnath, the other jyotirlingas are Mallikarjuna at Srisailam in Andhra Pradesh, Mahakaleswar at Ujjain in Madhya Pradesh, Omkareshwar in Madhya Pradesh, Kedarnath in Uttrakhand, Bhimashankar at Pune in Maharashtra, Viswanath at Varanasi in Uttar Pradesh, Tryambakeshwar at Nashik in Maharashtra, Vaijyanath Temple in Deoghar District of Jharkhand, Aundha Nagnath at Aundha in Hingoli District in Maharashtra, Ramanathaswamy Temple at Rameshwaram in Tamil Nadu and Grishneshwar at Ellora near Aurangabad, in Maharashtra.) The exact date of these texts is unknown, but based on references they make to other texts and ancient poets or scholars, these have been generally dated between the 10th and 12th century, with some dating it much earlier and others a bit later.

The Somnath temple is not mentioned in ancient Sanskrit texts of Hinduism, but the "Prabhasa Tirtha" is mentioned as a tirtha (pilgrimage site). For example, the Mahabharata (between c. 400 BCE to 200 BCE in its earliest form to 400 CE in its current form) in Chapters 109, 118 and 119 of the Book Three (Vana Parva), and Sections 10.45 and 10.78 of the Bhagavata Purana state Prabhasa to be a tirtha on the coastline of Saurashtra.

Alf Hiltebeitel – a Sanskrit scholar known for his translations and studies on Indic texts including the Mahabharata, states that the appropriate context for the legends and mythologies in the Mahabharata are the Vedic mythologies which it borrowed, integrated and re-adapted for its times and its audience. The Brahmana layer of the Vedic literature already mention tirtha related to the Saraswati river. However, given the river was nowhere to be seen when the Mahabharata was compiled and finalized, the Saraswati legend was modified. It vanishes into an underground river, then emerges as an underground river at holy sites for sangam (confluence) already popular with the Hindus. The Mahabharata then integrates the Saraswati legend of the Vedic lore with the Prabhasa tirtha, states Hiltebeitel. The critical editions of the Mahabharata, in several chapters and books mentions that this "Prabhasa" is at a coastline near Dvaraka. It is described as a sacred site where Arjuna and Balarama go on tirtha, a site where Lord Krishna chooses to go and spends his final days, then dies.

Catherine Ludvik – a Religious Studies and Sanskrit scholar, concurs with Hiltebeitel. She states that the Mahabharata mythologies borrow from the Vedic texts but modify them from Brahmin-centered "sacrificial rituals" to tirtha rituals that are available to everyone – the intended audience of the great epic. More specifically, she states that the sacrificial sessions along the Saraswati river found in sections such as of Pancavimsa Brahmana were modified to tirtha sites in the context of the Saraswati river in sections of Vana Parva and Shalya Parva. Thus the mythology of Prabhasa in the Mahabharata, which it states to be "by the sea, near Dwaraka". This signifies an expanded context of pilgrimage as a "Vedic ritual equivalent", integrating Prabhasa that must have been already important as a tirtha site when the Vana Parva and Shalya Parva compilation was complete. (Note: The date for the critical edition of the complete Mahabharata is generally accepted to be c. 400 CE.)

The 5th century poem Raghuvamsa of Kalidasa mentions Somanatha-Prabhasa as a tirtha along with Prayaga, Pushkara, Gokarna. Bathing in one of these tirthas is meant to release one from the cycle of births and deaths. (Note: Kalidas gives a separate list of jyotirlingas, in which Gokarna is included, but Prabhasa is not.)

There is no archaeological evidence that a temple existed at the site in ancient times.

== History ==
The site of Somnath has been a pilgrimage site from ancient times on account of being a Triveni Sangam (the confluence of three rivers: Kapila, Hiran and Saraswati). Soma, the Moon god, is believed to have lost his lustre due to a curse, and he bathed in the Sarasvati River at this site to regain it. The result is said to be the waxing and waning of the moon. The name of the town, Prabhasa, meaning lustre, as well as the alternative name Someshvara ("the lord of the moon" or "the moon god"), arise from this tradition.

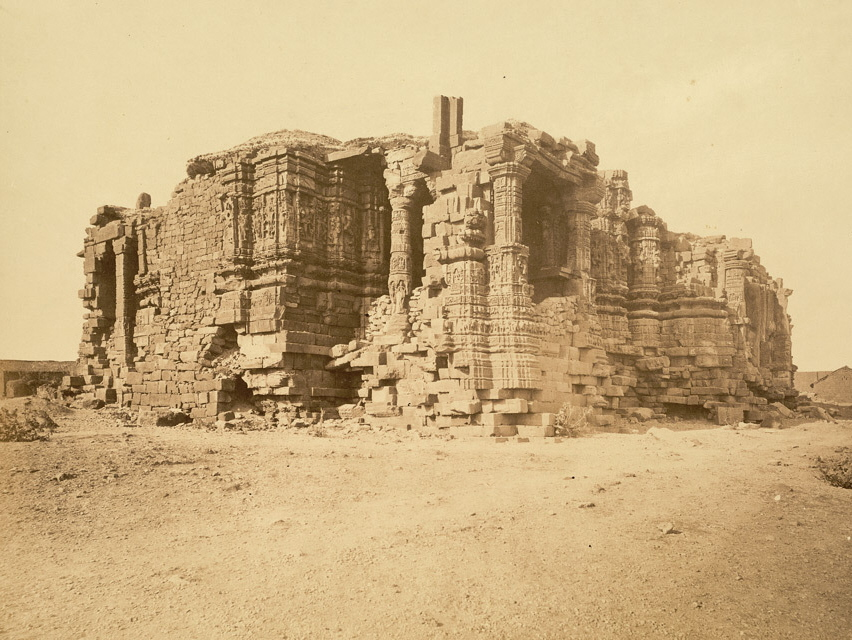
Ruined Somnath temple, 1869

The name Someshvara begins to appear in records from the 9th century. The Gurjara-Pratihara king Nagabhata II (r. 805–833) recorded that he had visited various tirthas in Saurashtra, including Someshvara. The Chaulukya (Solanki) king Mularaja is believed to have built the first temple dedicated to Soma ("the moon god") at the site sometime before 997 CE, even though some historians believe that he may have renovated an earlier, smaller temple. (Note: The post-1950 excavations of the Somnath site have unearthed the earliest known version of the Somnath temple. The excavations showed the foundations of a 10th-century temple, notable broken parts and details of a major, well decorated version of a temple. Madhusudan Dhaky believes it to have been the one that was destroyed by Mahmud of Ghazni. B.K. Thapar, the archaeologist who did the excavation, stated that there was definitely a temple structure at Somnath-Patan in the 9th century, but none before.)

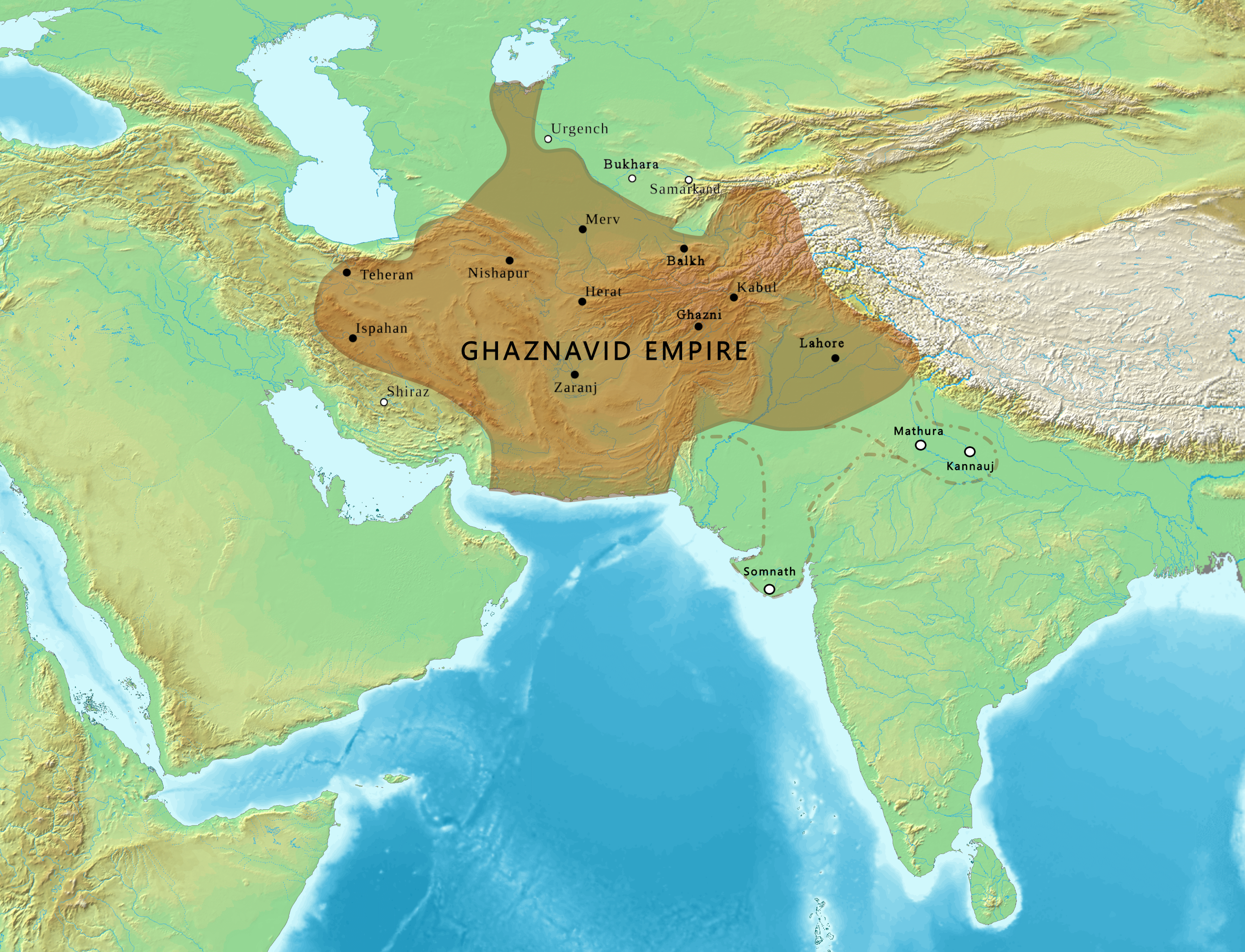
Mahmud of Ghazni, the Turkic Muslim ruler of the Ghaznavid Empire, raided India as far as Somnath, Mathura and Kannauj in Gurjara-Pratihara territory.

=== Mahmud of Ghazni’s Raid (1026 CE) ===
In 1026 CE, during the reign of Bhima I, the Turkic Muslim ruler Mahmud of Ghazni raided the Somnath temple after crossing the Thar desert, desecrated its jyotirlinga, and plundered 20 million dinars, including the temple's and city's gold in caravans to a Friday mosque in Ghazni. The condition of Somnath temple in 1026 CE after Ghazni's raid is unclear because a 1038 inscription of Kadamba king of Goa is "puzzlingly silent" about Ghazni's raid or temple's condition. This inscription, states Thapar, could suggest that instead of destruction it may have been a desecration because the temple seems to have been repaired quickly within twelve years and was an active pilgrimage site by 1038.

The raid of 1026 by Mahmud is confirmed by the 11th-century Persian historian Al-Biruni, who occasionally accompanied Mahmud's troops between 1017 and 1030 CE and lived intermittently in the northwest Indian subcontinent region. The invasion of Somnath site in 1026 CE is also confirmed by other Islamic historians such as Gardizi, Ibn Zafir and Ibn al-Athir. However, two Persian sources – one by adh-Dhahabi and other by al-Yafi'i – state it as 1027 CE, which is likely incorrect and late by a year, according to Khan – a scholar known for his studies on Al-Biruni and other Persian historians. According to Al-Biruni:

The location of the Somnath temple was a little less than three miles west of the mouth of the river Sarasvati. The temple was situated on the coast of the Indian ocean so that at the time of flow the idol was bathed by its water. Thus that moon was perpetually occupied in bathing the idol and serving it."

— Translated by M.S. Khan

Al-Biruni states that Mahmud destroyed the Somnath temple. He states Mahmud's motives as, "raids undertaken with a view to plunder and to satisfy the righteous iconoclasm of a true Muslim... [he] returned to Ghazna laden with costly spoils from the Hindu temples." Al-Biruni obliquely criticizes these raids for "ruining the prosperity" of India, creating antagonism among the Hindus for "all foreigners", and triggering an exodus of scholars of Hindu sciences far away from regions "conquered by us". Mahmud launched many plunder campaigns into India, including one that included the sack of Somnath temple.

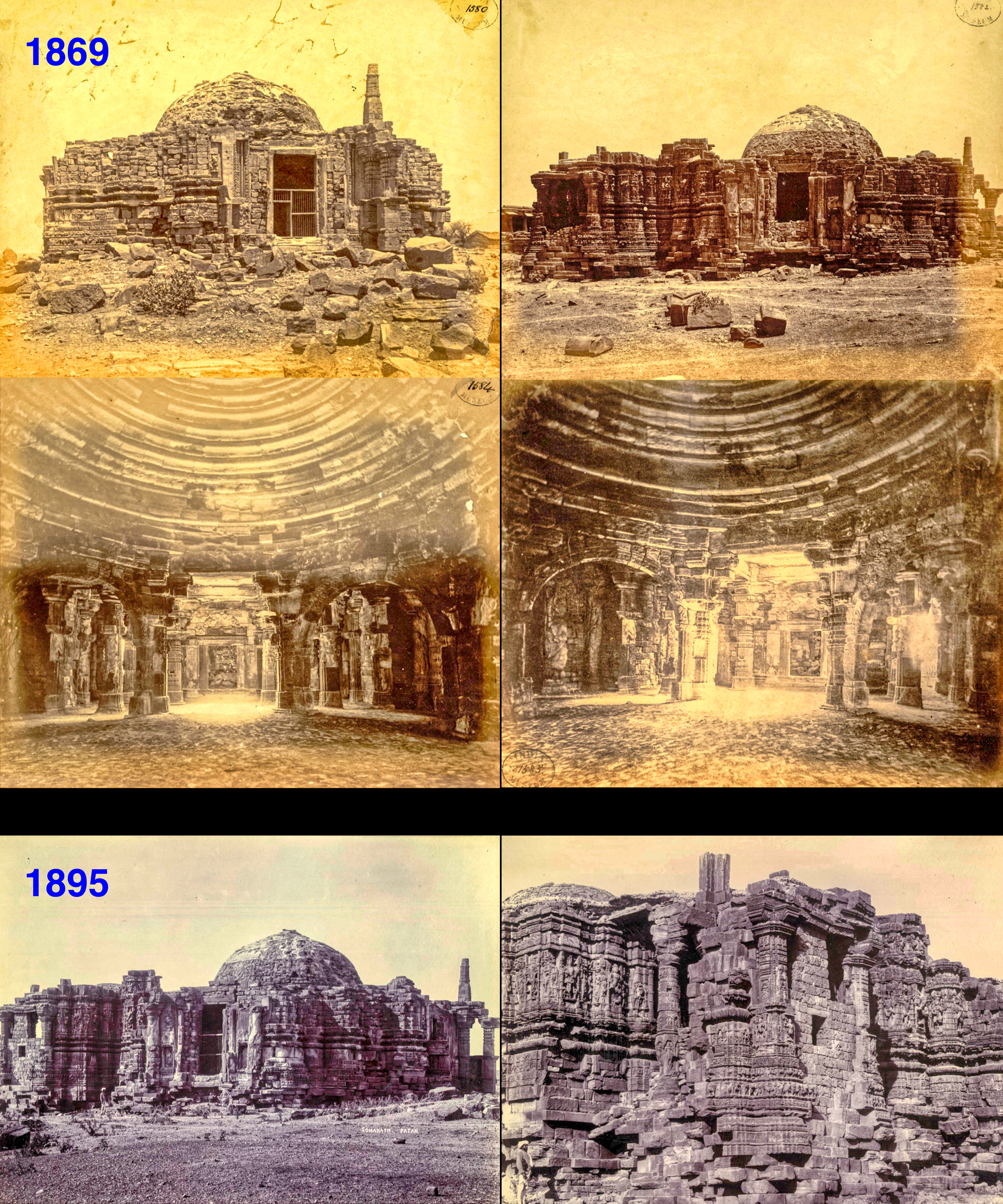
Some of the earliest photos of Somnath temple were taken by Sykes and Nelson in the 19th century. They show Somnath Hindu temple partly converted into an Islamic mosque.

According to Jamal Malik – a South Asian history and Islamic Studies scholar, "the destruction of Somnath temple, a well known place of pilgrimage in Gujarat in 1026, played a major role in creating Mahmud as an "icon of Islam", the sack of this temple became "a crucial topic in Persian stories of Islamic iconoclasm". Many Muslim historians and scholars in and after the 11th century included the destruction of Somnath as a righteous exemplary deed in their publications. It inspired the Persian side with a cultural memory of Somnath's destruction through "epics of conquest", while to the Hindu side, Somnath inspired tales of recovery, rebuilding and "epics of resistance". These tales and chronicles in Persia elevated Mahmud as "the exemplary hero and Islamic warrior for the Muslims", states Malik, while in India Mahmud emerged as the exemplary "arch-enemy".

Powerful legends with intricate detail developed in the Turko-Persian literature regarding Mahmud's raid. According to historian Cynthia Talbot, a later tradition states that "50,000 devotees lost their lives in trying to stop Mahmud" during his sack of Somnath temple. According to Thapar, the "50,000 killed" is a boastful claim that is "constantly reiterated" in Muslim texts, and becomes a "formulaic" figure of deaths to help highlight "Mahmud’s legitimacy in the eyes of established Islam".

=== Temple Rebuilding — Kumarapala ===
After being exhorted by Bhava Brihaspati, a Pashupata ascetic, Kumarapala (r. 1143–72) rebuilt the Somnath temple in "excellent stone and studded it with jewels," according to an inscription in 1169. He replaced a decaying wooden temple.

=== Khalji's Invasion ===
During its 1299 invasion of Gujarat, Alauddin Khalji's army, led by Ulugh Khan, defeated the Vaghela king Karna, and sacked the Somnath temple. Legends in the later texts Kanhadade Prabandha (15th century) and Nainsi ri Khyat (17th century) state that the Jalore ruler Kanhadadeva later recovered the Somnath idol and freed the Hindu prisoners, after an attack on the Delhi army near Jalore. However, other sources state that the idol was taken to Delhi, where it was thrown to be trampled under the feet of Muslims. These sources include the contemporary and near-contemporary texts including Amir Khusrau's Khazainul-Futuh, Ziauddin Barani's Tarikh-i-Firuz Shahi and Jinaprabha Suri's Vividha-tirtha-kalpa. It is possible that the story of Kanhadadeva's rescue of the Somnath idol is a fabrication by the later writers. Alternatively, it is possible that the Khalji army was taking multiple idols to Delhi, and Kanhadadeva's army retrieved one of them.

=== Chudasama Restoration ===
The temple was rebuilt by Mahipala I, the Chudasama king of Saurashtra in 1308 and the lingam was installed by his son Khengara sometime between 1331 and 1351. As late as the 14th century, Gujarati Muslim pilgrims were noted by Amir Khusrow to stop at that temple to pay their respects before departing for the Hajj pilgrimage. In 1395, the temple was destroyed for the third time by Zafar Khan, the last governor of Gujarat under the Delhi Sultanate and later founder of Gujarat Sultanate. In 1451, it was desecrated by Mahmud Begada, the Sultan of Gujarat.

=== Mughal Attempts for Conversion ===
By 1665, the temple, one of many, was ordered to be destroyed by Mughal emperor Aurangzeb. However, the order appears not to have been carried out at that time. Aurangzeb ordered its destruction and conversion into a mosque again in 1706; this order does seem to have been carried out, though very little effort seems to have been put into the conversion.

=== Later reconstruction by Ahilyabai Holkar ===
A separate, smaller temple was built near the ruins of the main shrine by Ahilyabai Holkar, The Gadariya - Dhangar Queen of Malwa. This event is a significant part of the temple's history after it was repeatedly damaged and finally ordered to be demolished by the Mughal emperor Aurangzeb in 1706. Ahilyabai's Temple: The Maharani constructed this temple around 1783 CE (or 1785/1786 CE) to establish a safe place for pilgrims to continue worshipping Lord Shiva near the original site, which was then in a ruined state. Location and Significance: This shrine, often known as the Old Somnath Temple or Ahilyabai Temple, is located adjacent to the present main temple. Its construction ensured that the sacred worship of the Jyotirlinga could continue uninterrupted for centuries before the final reconstruction of the current Somnath Temple began in 1950. Restoration efforts: Ahilyabai Holkar is renowned for rebuilding and restoring Hindu temples and sites of pilgrimage across India, including parts of Kashi Vishwanath Temple, Gaya, and Dwarka, demonstrating her profound religious devotion and commitment to preserving Hindu sacred geography.

=== British Raj ===
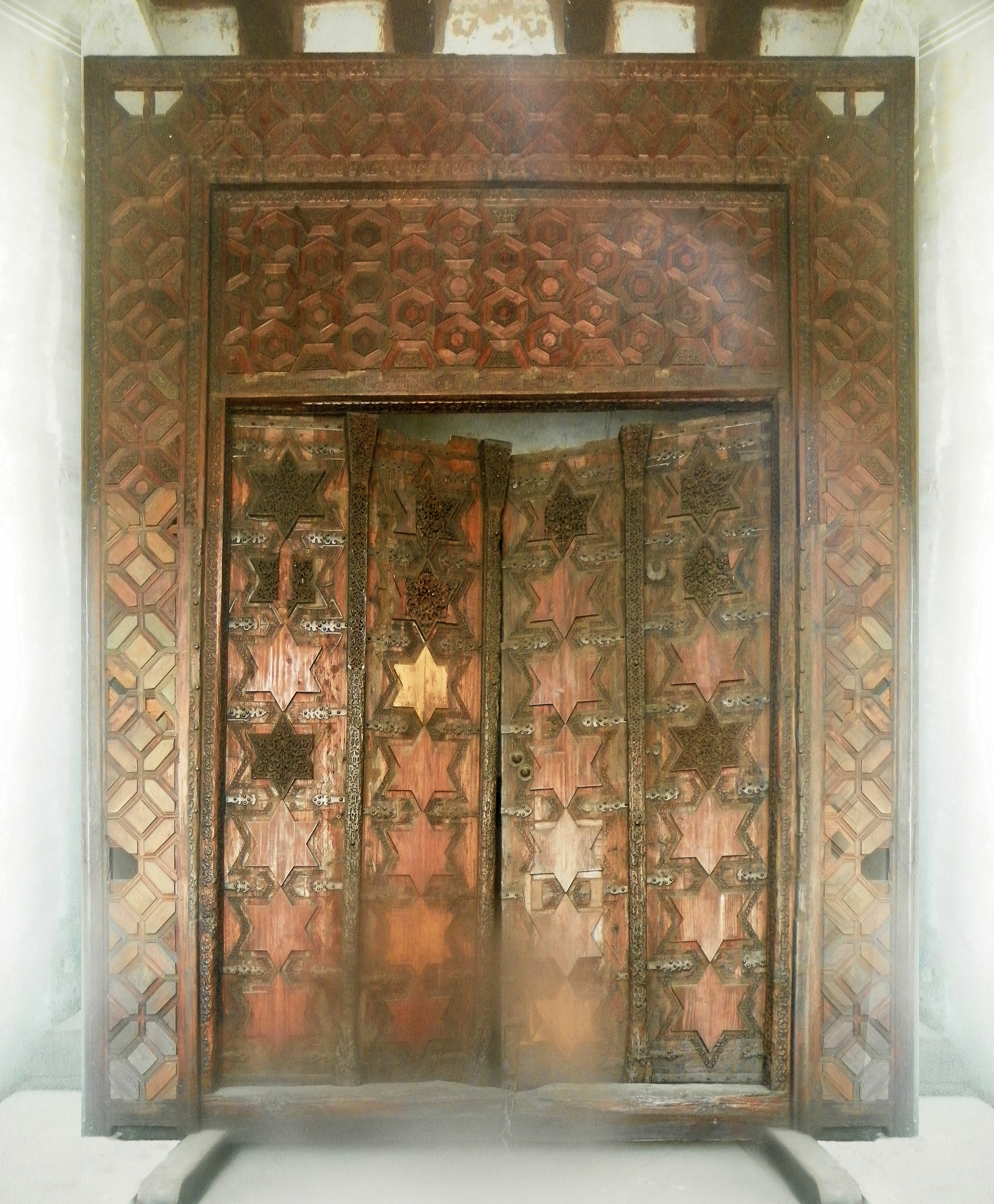
The Gates from the tomb of Mahmud of Ghazni, stored in the Arsenal of Agra Fort.

In 1842, Governor-General Lord Ellenborough issued the Proclamation of the Gates, instructing the British army returning from Afghanistan to bring back the sandalwood gates of Somnath temple from the tomb of Mahmud of Ghazni in Ghazni, Afghanistan. These were believed to have been taken by Mahmud from Somnath. Under Ellenborough's instruction, General William Nott retrieved the gates in September 1842 and the 6th Jat Light Infantry was detailed to carry the gates back to India. However, on arrival, the gates were proved to be of Deodar wood not of Sandalwood, and they were not of Gujarati style. The gates have remained in the arsenal store-room of the Agra Fort ever since. There was a debate in the House of Commons in London in 1843 on the question of the gates of the temple and Ellenbourough's role in the affair. After much crossfire between the British Government and the opposition, all of the facts as we know them were laid out.

In the 1868 novel The Moonstone by Wilkie Collins, the diamond of the title is presumed to have been stolen from the temple at Somnath and, according to the historian Romila Thapar, reflects the interest aroused in Britain by the gates. Her 2004 book on Somnath examines the evolution of the historiographies about the legendary Gujarat temple.

=== Reconstruction during 1950–1951 ===
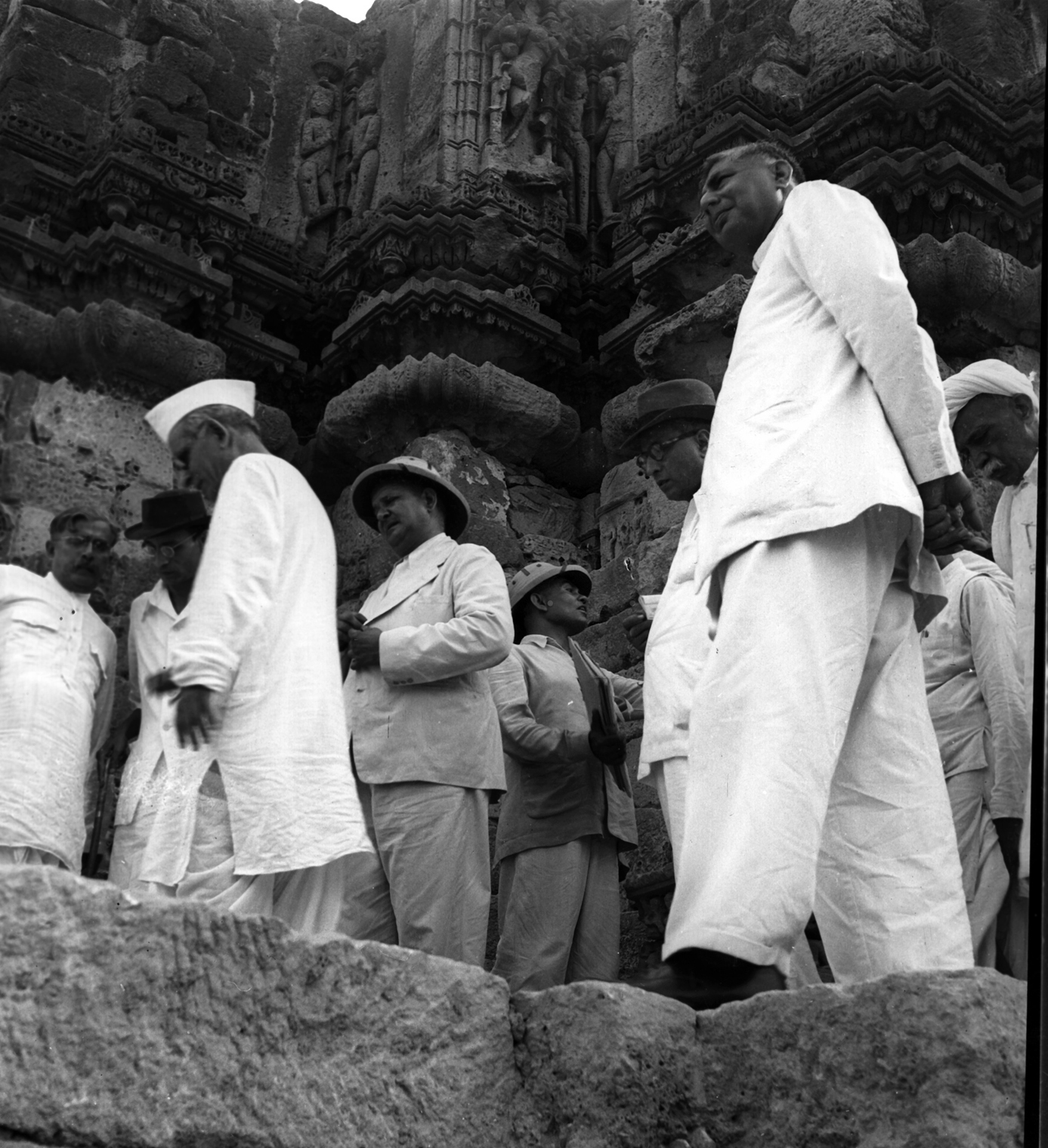
K. M. Munshi with archaeologists and engineers of the Government of India, Bombay, and Saurashtra, with the ruins of Somnath Temple in the background, July 1950.

Before independence, Veraval was part of the Junagadh State, whose ruler had acceded to Pakistan in 1947. India contested the accession and annexed the state after holding a referendum. India's Deputy Prime Minister Vallabhbhai Patel came to Junagadh on 12 November 1947 to direct the stabilization of the state by the Indian Army, at which time he ordered the reconstruction of the Somnath temple.

When Patel, K. M. Munshi and other leaders of the Congress went to Mahatma Gandhi with their proposal to reconstruct the Somnath temple, Gandhi blessed the move but suggested that the funds for the construction should be collected from the public, and the temple should not be funded by the state. Accordingly, The Somnath Trust was established to collect funds and oversee the construction of the temple. Munshi headed the Trust. Being the Civil Supplies minister in the Government of India, Munshi was keen to involve the Government of India in the reconstruction effort, but he was overruled by Nehru. According to Pandit Prem Nath Bazaz, there had been an agreement between the U.P. Government and the Indian Sugar Syndicate, wherein six annas (that is 40 paise) had to be collected out of the price of every mound of sugar by the Syndicate for the renovation of the Somnath temple.

The ruins were pulled down in October 1950. The mosque present at that site was shifted few kilometres away by using construction vehicles. The new structure was built by the traditional Sompura builders of temples in Gujarat. On 11 May 1951, Rajendra Prasad, the President of India performed the installation ceremony for the temple at the invitation of Munshi.

=== 21st century ===
As of 2024, the pilgrim corridor is under planning. As a part of land requirement, the encroachments were removed and land was reclaimed in 2024. Further land acquisitions were also planned.

== Temple Architecture ==
=== Pre-11th century temple ===
The floor plan and ruins of a pre-1000 CE temple were unearthed during the archaeological excavations led by B.K. Thapar. Most of the temple is lost, but the remains of the foundation, the lower structure as well as pieces of the temple ruins suggest an "exquisitely carved, rich" temple. According to Dhaky – a scholar of Indian temple architecture, this is the earliest known version of the Somnath temple. It was, what historic Sanskrit vastu sastra texts call the tri-anga sandhara prasada. Its garbhagriha (sanctum) was connected to a mukhamandapa (entrance hall) and gudhamandapa.

The temple opened to the east. The stylobate of this destroyed temple had two parts: the 3 feet high pitha-socle and the vedibandha-podium. The pitha had a tall bhitta, joined to the jadyakumbha, ornamented with what Dhaky calls "crisp and charming foliage pattern". The kumbha of the Vedibandha had a Surasenaka with a niche that contained the figure of Lakulisa – this evidence affirms that the lost temple was a Shiva temple.

The excavations yielded pieces of one at the western end, which suggests that the kumbhas were aligned to the entire wall. Above the kalaga moulding was an antarapatta, states Dhaky, but no information is available to determine its design or ornamentation. The surviving fragment of the kapotapali that was discovered suggests that at "intervals, it was decorated with contra-posed half thakaras, with large, elegant, and carefully shaped gagarakas in suspension graced the lower edge of the kapotapali", states Dhaky. The garbhagriha had a vedibandha, possibly with a two-layered jangha with images on the main face showing the influence of the late Maha-Maru style. Another fragment found had a "beautifully moulded rounded pillarette and a ribbed khuraccadya-awning topped the khattaka".

The mukhachatuski, states Dhaky, likely broke and fell immediately after the destructive hit by Mahmud's troops. These fragments suffered no further erosion or damage one would normally expect, likely because it was left in the foundation pit of the new Somnath temple that was rebuilt quickly after Mahmud left. The "quality of craftsmanship" in these fragments is "indeed high", the carvings of the lost temple were "rich and exquisite", states Dhaky. Further, a few pieces have an inscription fragment in the 10th-century characters – which suggests that this part of the temple or the entire temple was built in the 10th century.

19th-century ruined Somnath temple partly converted into mosque

The efforts of colonial era archaeologists, photographers and surveyors have yielded several reports on the architecture and arts seen at the Somnath temple ruins in the 19th century. The earliest survey reports of Somnath temple and the condition of the Somanatha-Patan-Veraval town in the 19th century were published between 1830 and 1850 by British officers and scholars. Alexander Burnes surveyed the site in 1830, calling Somnath site as "far-famed temple and city". He wrote:

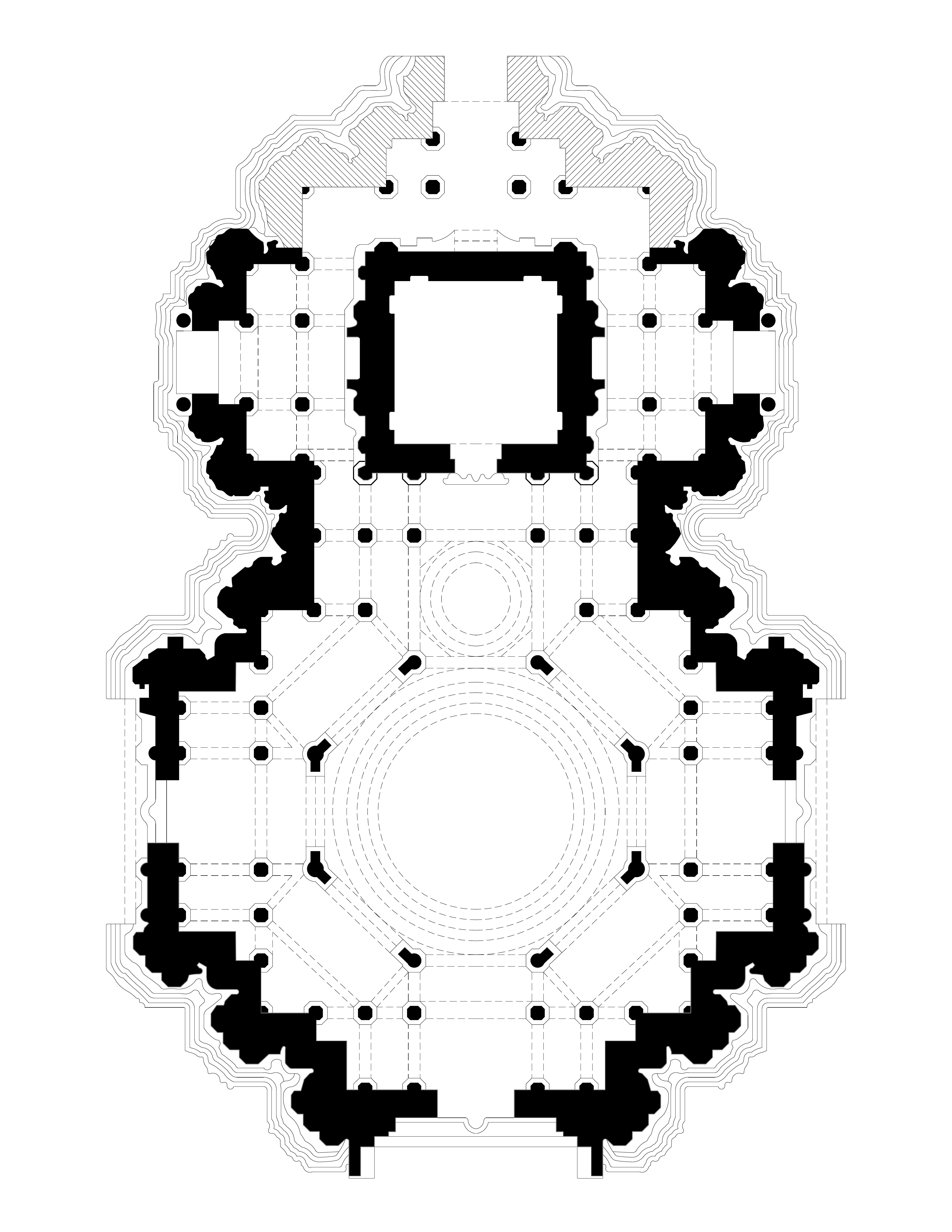
Floor plan of the main Somnath temple, Veraval Gujarat

The great temple of Somnath stands on a rising ground on the north-west side of Pattan, inside the walls, and is only separated by them from the sea. It may be scen from a distance of twenty-five miles. It is a massy stone building, evidently of some antiquity. Unlike Hindu temples gencrally, it consists of three domes, the first of which forms the roof of the entrance, the second is the interior of the temple, the third was the sanctum sanctorum, wherein were deposited the riches of Hindi devotion. The two external domes are diminutive: the central one has an elevation of more than thirty feet, tapering to the summit in fourteen steps, and is about forty feet in diameter. It is perfect, but the images which have once adorned both the interior and exterior of the building are mutilated, and the black polished stones which formed its floor have been removed by the citizens for less pious purposes. Two marble slabs, with sentences from the Koran, and inscriptions regarding Mangrol Isa, point out where that Mohammedan worthy rests. They arc on the western side of the city, and the place is still frequented by the devout Moslem. Near it is a cupola, supported on pillars, to mark the grave of the sultan's cashkeeper, with many others; and the whole city is encircled by the remains of mosques, and one vast cemetery, ‘The field of battle, where the “infidels” were conquered, is also pointed out, and the massy walls, excavated ditch, paved streets, and squared-stone buildings of Pattan itself, proclaim its former greatness. At present the city is a perfect ruin, its houses are nearly unoccupied and but for a new and substantial temple, erected to house the god of Somnath by that wonderful woman, Ahalya Bai, the wife of Holkar.

— Alexander Burnes

He states that the site shows how the temple had been changed into a Muslim structure with arch, these sections had been reconstructed with "mutilated pieces of the temple's exterior" and "inverted Hindu images". Such modifications in the dilapidated Somnath temple to make it into a "Mohammedan sanctuary", states Burnes, is "proof of Mohammedan devastation" of this site. Burnes also summarized some of the mythologies he heard, the bitter communal sentiments and accusations, as well as the statements by garrisoned "Arabs of the Junagar [Junagadh] chief" about their victories in this "infidel land".

The survey report of Captain Postans was published in 1846. He states:

Pattan, and all the part of the country wherein it is situated, is now under a Mohamedan ruler, the Nawab of Junagadh, and the city itself offers the most curious specimen of any I have ever seen of its original Hindu character, preserved throughout its walls, gates, and buildings, despite Mohammedan innovations and a studied attempt to obliterate the traces of paganism ; even the very musjids, which are here and there encountered in the town, have been raised by materials from the sacred edifices of the conquered, or, as it is said by the historians of Sindh, “the true believers turned the temples of the idol worshippers into places of prayer.” Old Pattan is to this day a Hindu city in all but its inhabitants—perhaps one of the most interesting historical spots in Western India. [...] Somnath assumed the appearance it now presents, of a temple evidently of pagan original altered by the introduction of a Mohammedan style of architecture in various portions, but leaving its general plan and minor features unmolested. [...] The temple consists of one large hall in an oblong form, from one end of which proceeds a small square chamber, or sanctum. The centre of the hall is occupied by a noble dome over an octagon of eight arches; the remainder of the roof terraced and supported by numerous pillars. There are three éntrances. The sides of the building face to the cardinal points, and the principal entrance appears to be on the eastern side. These doorways ave unusually high and wide, in the Pyramidal or Egyptian form, decreasing towards the top; they add much to the effect of the building. Internally, the whole presents a scene of complete destruction; the pavement is everywhere covered with heaps of stones and rubbish; the facings of the walls, capitals of the pillars, in short, every portion possessing anything approaching to ornament, having been defaced or removed, (if not by Mahmud, by those who subsequently converted this temple into its present semi-Mohammedan appearance). [...] Externally the whole of the buildings are most elaborately carved and ornamented with figures, single and in groups of various dimensions, Many of them appear to have been of some size; but so laboriously was the work of mutilation carried on here, that of the larger figures scarcely a trunk has been left, whilst few even of the most minute remain uninjured. The western side is the most perfect: here the pillars and ornaments are in excellent preservation. The front entrance is ornamented with a portico, and surmounted by two slender minarets ornaments so much in the Mohammedan style, that they, as well as the domes, have evidently been added to the original building.

— Thomas Postans

A more detailed survey report of Somnath temple ruins was published in 1931 by Henry Cousens. Cousens states that the Somnath temple is dear to the Hindu consciousness, its history and lost splendor remembered by them, and no other temple in Western India is "so famous in the annals of Hinduism as the temple of Somanatha at Somanatha-Pattan". The Hindu pilgrims walk to the ruins here and visit it along with their pilgrimage to Dwarka, Gujarat, though it has been reduced to a 19th-century site of gloom, full of "ruins and graves". His survey report states:

The old temple of Somanatha is situated in the town, and stands upon the shore towards its eastern end, being separated from the sea by a heavily built retaining wall which prevents the former from washing away the ground around the foundations of the shrine. Little now remains of the walls of the temple; they have been, in great measure, rebuilt and patched with rubble to convert the building into a mosque. The great dome, indeed the whole roof and the stumpy minars, one of which remains above the front entrance, are portions of the Muhammadan additions. [...] One fact alone shows that the temple was built on a large scale, and that is the presence in its basement of the asvathara or horse-moulding. It was probably about the same size, in plan, as the Rudra Mala at Siddhapur, being, in length, about 140 feet over all. [...] The walls, or, at least, the outer casing of them, having in great part fallen, there is revealed, in several places, the finished masonry and mouldings of the basement of an older temple, which appears not to have been altogether removed when the temple, we now see, was built, portions of this older temple being apparently left in situ to form the heart and core of the later masonry. [...] For several reasons, I have come to the conclusion that the ruined temple, as it now stands, save for the Muhammadan additions, is a remnant of the temple built by Kumarapala, king of Gujarat, about AD 1169.

— Henry Cousens

Present temple

The present temple is a Māru-Gurjara architecture (also called Chaulukya or Solanki style) temple. It has a "Kailash Mahameru Prasad" form, and reflects the skill of the Sompura Salats, one of Gujarat's master masons.

The architect of the new Somnath temple was Prabhashankarbhai Oghadbhai Sompura, who worked on recovering and integrating the old recoverable parts with the new design in the late 1940s and early 1950s. The new Somnath temple is intricately carved, two level temple with pillared mandapa and 212 relief panels.

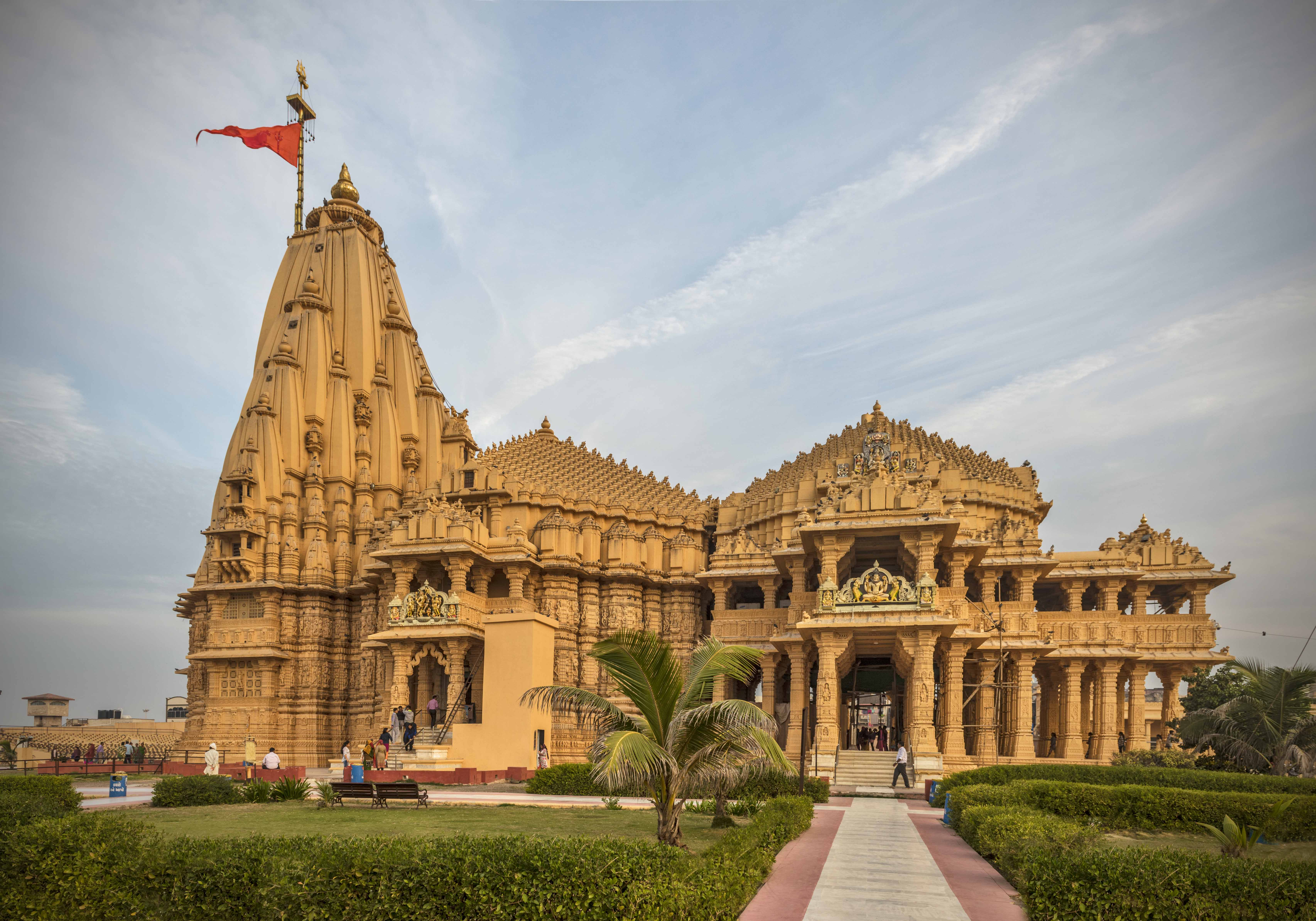
A wide-angle view – a bit distorted – from the southeast side of the present Somnath temple. Nataraja can be seen on the sukhanasi, along with the two-storey design.

The temple's śikhara, or main spire, is 15 metres (49 ft) in height above the sanctum, and it has an 8.2-metre-tall flag pole at the top. According to Ananda Coomaraswamy – an art and architecture historian, the earlier Somnath temple ruin followed the Solanki-style, which is Nagara architecture inspired by the Vesara ideas found in Western regions of India.

=== Artwork ===
The rebuilt temple as found in the ruined form in the 19th century and the current temple used recovered parts of previous temple with significant artwork. The new temple has added and integrated the new panels with a few old ones, the color of the stone distinguishing the two. The panels and pillars with historic artwork were and are found in the south and southwest side of the Somnath temple.

In general, the reliefs and sculpture is mutilated, to the point that it is difficult for most to "identify the few images that remain" on panels, states Cousens. An original Nataraja (Tandava Shiva), albeit with chopped arms and defaced, can be seen on the south side. A mutilated Nandi is to the right. To the left of this are traces of Shiva-Parvati, with the goddess seated in his lap. Towards the north-east corner, portions of panels in a band similar to Ramayana scenes in historic Hindu temples can be traced. Sections can be seen with "beautiful vertical mouldings, on either side of the main front doorway", states Cousens, and this suggests that the destroyed temple was "exceedingly richly carved". The temple likely had a galaxy of Vedic and Puranic deities, as one of the partially surviving relief shows Surya's iconography – two lotuses in his hand.

The older temple featured an open plan, with great windows that allow light into the mandapa and circumambulation passage. The intricate and detailed artwork inside and on the pillars of Somnath temple were quite similar to those found in the Luna Vasahi temple at Mount Abu.

== Tirtha and festivals ==
The Somnath-Prabhasa tirtha has been one of the revered tirtha (pilgrimage) site for the Hindus. It is the famed Prabhasa site found in Brahmi script inscriptions in Maharashtra sites. It is mentioned in the poems of Kalidasa. As of 1968, the new temple was the top pilgrimage site in Gujarat along with Dwarka.

== Archaeological studies ==
The Somnath temple site and coastline has been excavated for archaeological evidence by Indian teams. The first major excavation was completed in 1950–51 just before the Somnath temple was reconstructed. It was led by B. K. Thapar, one of the Director General of Archaeological Survey of India, and a report published. This Thapar study yielded direct and substantial evidence of a 10th-century or earlier large temple. B. K. Thapar estimated the older temple to be from the 9th century, while Dhaky states to more likely from the 10th century, i.e. from 960 to 973 CE. The Thapar study also found artifacts and ruins with ancient scripts such as Brahmi and later scripts such as proto-Nagari and Nagari, thus confirming the antiquity of Somnath-Patan through at least much of the 1st-millennium.

A few Somnath-Patan sites around the Somnath temple was excavated in the 1970s, led by M. K. Dhavalikar and Z. D. Ansari. They dug deeper at several locations, reported evidence of five periods of human settlement. In 1992, M. K. Dhavalikar and Gregory Possehl – an archaeologist known for his Indus Valley studies, reported their analysis of archaeological discoveries from Prabhas-Patan. According to them, the Somnath site shows evidence of ancient human settlement, from pre-2nd millennium BCE period. They date one period to "pre-Harappan phase". However, these discoveries are all ceramics, wares and jewelry (amulet), and they found no ancient "temple parts". According to Charles Herman's critical review, the evidence available so far does not allow any direct inferences about the society and culture in pre-1st millennium BCE era, but there is persuasive evidence that Prabhas-Patan was an early Harappan site with sedentary farming and cattle keeping and it is in the same league of significance as the Dholavira (Kutch) and Rojdi (Sorath-Harappan) archaeological sites. Further, the Prabhas-Patan mounds that have been excavated show evidence of continued post-Harappan settlement (c. 2000– 1800 BCE) along with several other Saurashtra sites. According to Herman, the archaeological excavations in Prabhas-Patan and Saurashtra region have been too few to make systematic conclusions.

== Legacy ==
=== Iran ===
The Somnath temple has inspired different narratives and legacies, for some a symbol of blessed conquest and victories, for some a symbol of fanatical intolerance and persecution. After the 1026 sack of the Somnath temple, states Mehrdad Shokoohy, the "sack of Somnath was not just yet another campaign of a medieval Sultan confined to histories, but a symbol of the revival of Iranian identity boosted by religious zeal, which was to echo in literature and folklore" for nearly one thousand years. The destruction of the Somnath temple – called Sūmanāt in Persian literature, and the killing of Hindus has been portrayed as a celebrated event in numerous versions of history, stories and poems found in Persia written over the centuries. The Persian literature has made mythical ahistorical connections of Somnath to Manat. The destruction of both has been celebrated by the Islamic scholars and elites.

=== India ===
On the Indian side, the Somnath temple has been more than another house of worship. For Hindus, it is a question of their heritage, their sense of sacred time and space, states Peter van der Veer. Its history raises questions of tolerance and spiritual values to expect, and of a symbol of fanaticism and foreign oppression. The Somnath temple has been leveraged to revisit India's history and agitate over its sacred spaces including contested sites such as Ayodhya. Mahmud and Aurangzeb along with the ideology that inspired them are remembered as enemies of the ancient Hindu nation. They are asserted as two historical facts, the former as the first and the latter as the last systematic destroyers of Somnath temple.

The reconstruction of Somnath temple after independence also became an important episode in the history of heritage and nation-building in India. The temple acquired meanings that extended beyond its religious significance, becoming associated with competing interpretations of India's past and the character of the new Indian state.

The Somnath temple was used as a cultural symbol and the starting point for a Rath yatra (chariot journey), states K.N. Pannikkar, by Lal Krishna Advani to begin his Ayodhya campaign in 1990. According to Donald Smith, the reconstruction efforts in the 1950s was not about restoring an ancient architecture, rather the Somnath temple was of religious significance. The rebuilding was a symbol, it was Hindu repudiation of almost a thousand years of Muslim domination, oppression, and reassertion of a safe haven for Hindus in post-partitioned India.

The reconstructed Somnath temple has been the preferred pilgrimage site for Hindus in Gujarat, often combined with a pilgrimage to Dwarka. The site attracts Hindus from all over India, states David Sopher.

=== Pakistan and West Asia ===
In the modern era textbooks of Pakistan, the sack of Somnath temple is praised and the campaign of Sultan Mahmud of Ghaznavi is glorified as a "champion of Islam". According to Syed Zaidi – a scholar of Islamist Militancy, a school book in Pakistan titled Our World portrays Somnath temple as a "place where all the Hindu rajas used to get together" and think about "fighting the Muslims". Mahmud went to this temple and "blew the idol in pieces" and "this success was a source of happiness for the whole Muslim world". Another textbook for Pakistan's Middle School repeats a similar narrative, teaching its students that the Somnath temple was not really a Hindu temple but a political center. According to Ashok Behuria and Mohammad Shehzad, the Somnath legacy is narrated in this textbook as, "according to most historians Mahmud invaded India seventeen times to crush the power of the Hindu Rajas and Maharajas who were always busy planning conspiracies against him ... After the fall of Punjab, the Hindus assembled at Somnath — which was more of a political centre than a temple — to plan a big war against Mahmud. He took all the Rajas and Maharajas by surprise when he attacked Somnath and crushed the Hindu headquarter of political intrigue. With the destruction of Somnath he broke the backbone of the Hindus in the region and thus had no need to attack India again".

In Islamic State nationalist literature of the modern era, Sultan Mahmud campaign in the 11th century has been glorified as a historic "jihad against non-Muslims", his motive in destroying Somnath temple is described as "not driven by worldly gain [wealth]", but because he wanted to "end the worship of idols".

=== Afghanistan ===
In 1842, during the First Anglo-Afghan War, the Governor-General of India Lord Ellenborough ordered his troops to bring the wooden gates from the tomb of Mahmud of Ghazni in Ghazni, Afghanistan back to India; it was believed Mahmud had taken them from Somnath Temple. However, there was nor there is any evidence that Somnath temple or its site ever had any wooden gates. Nor is there any evidence that Mahmud or later conquerors ever took any gates from Prabhas-Patan region as a part of the plunder. This order has been called the Proclamation of the Gates. The order, states Thapar, is best seen as an example of how "colonial intervention in India" was viewed in the 1840s.

=== Literature ===
A fictionalized version of the temple appears in the Epilogue to the 1868 novel, The Moonstone. The plot involves the loss of a great diamond which at the end of the story is returned here to a statue of Chandra, the Hindu god of the moon.

=== Popular culture ===
Kesari Veer is a 2025 Indian Hindi-language historical action film directed by Prince Dhiman. The film is co-produced by Rajen Chauhan, Heena Chauhan, Suhraj Chauhan and Ohm Chauhan. Written, co-directed and produced by Kanubhai Chauhan of Chauhan Studios, the film stars Suniel Shetty, Vivek Oberoi, Sooraj Pancholi and Akanksha Sharma. It tells the story of Rajput warrior Hamirji Gohil, who fought against the Tughlaq empire to protect the Somnath Temple from destruction.

== Gallery ==
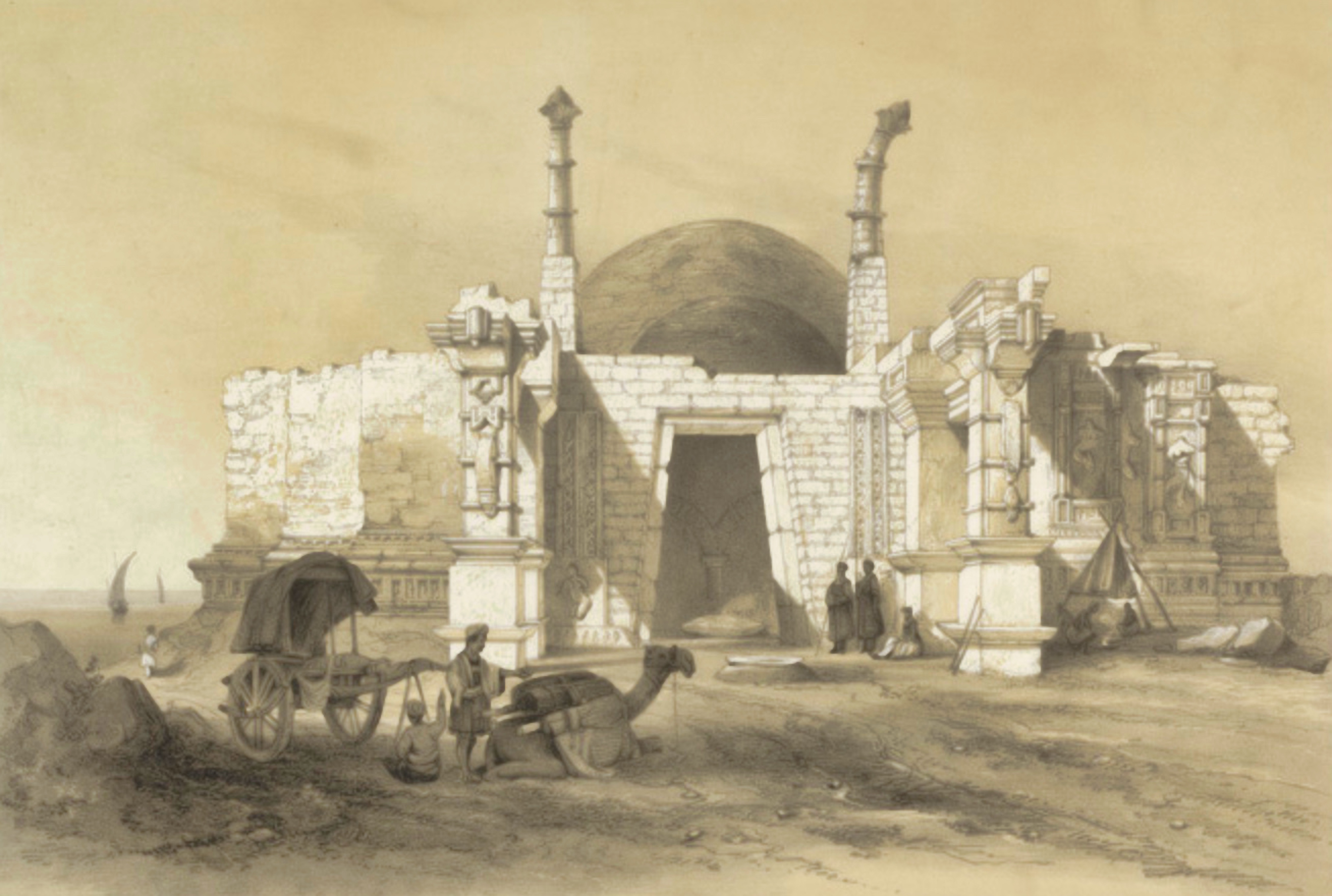
Somnath converted into mosque, partly correct, partly embellished sketch (1850 CE)

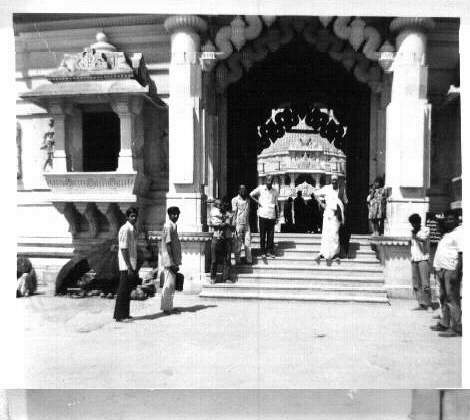
Somnath Temple in 1957

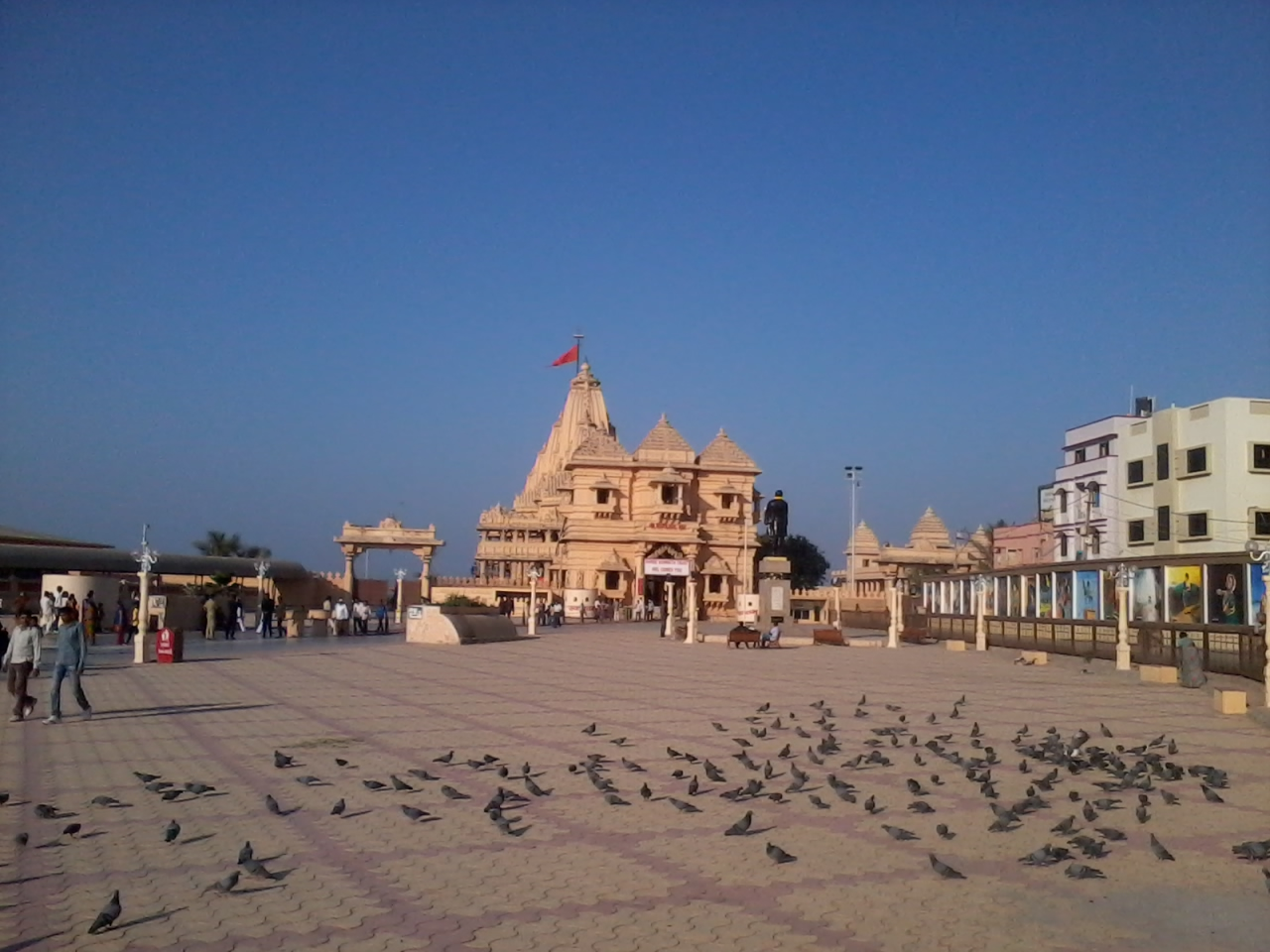
Somnath Temple in 2012

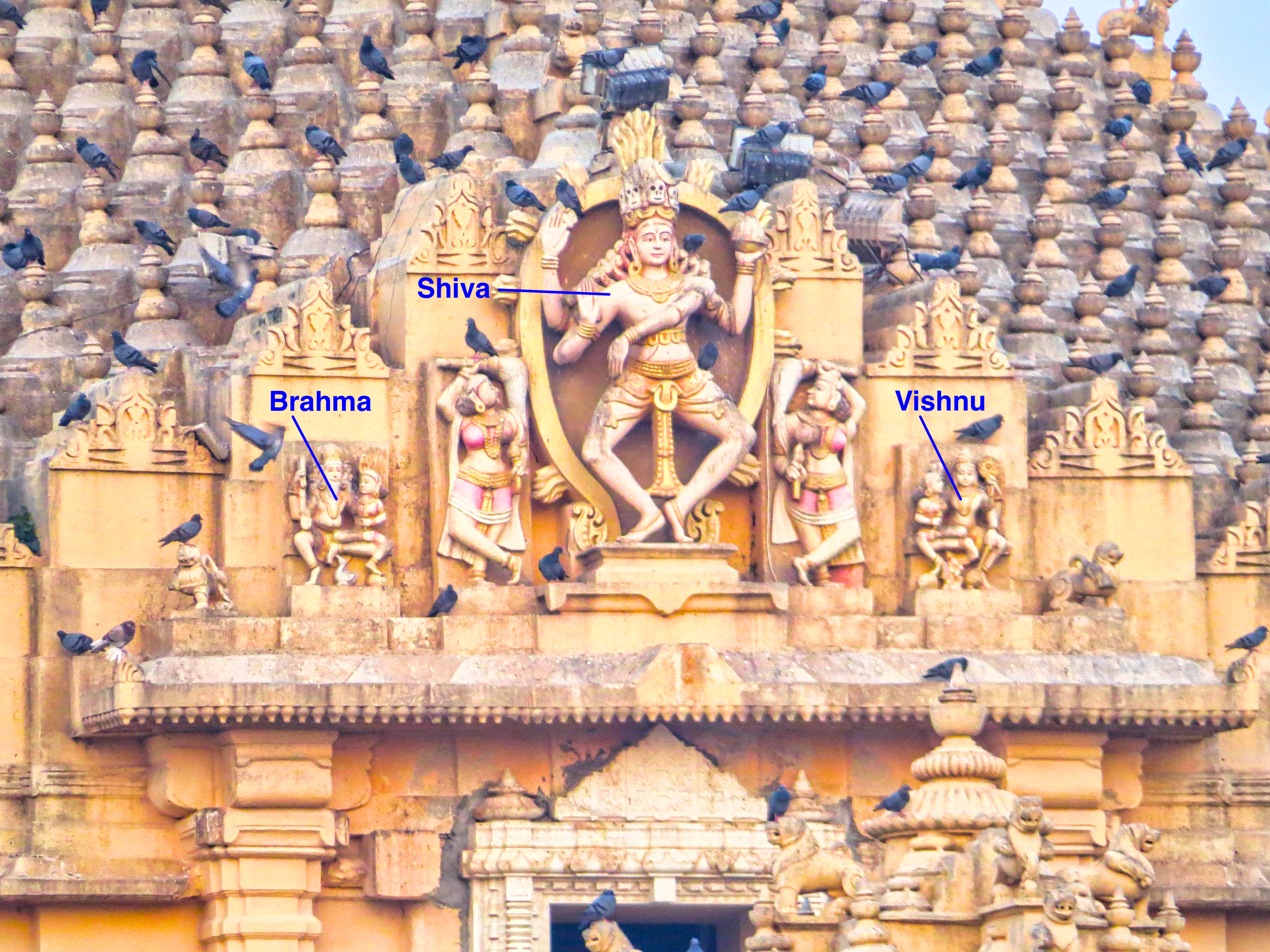
Brahma-Shiva-Vishnu above mukhamandapa

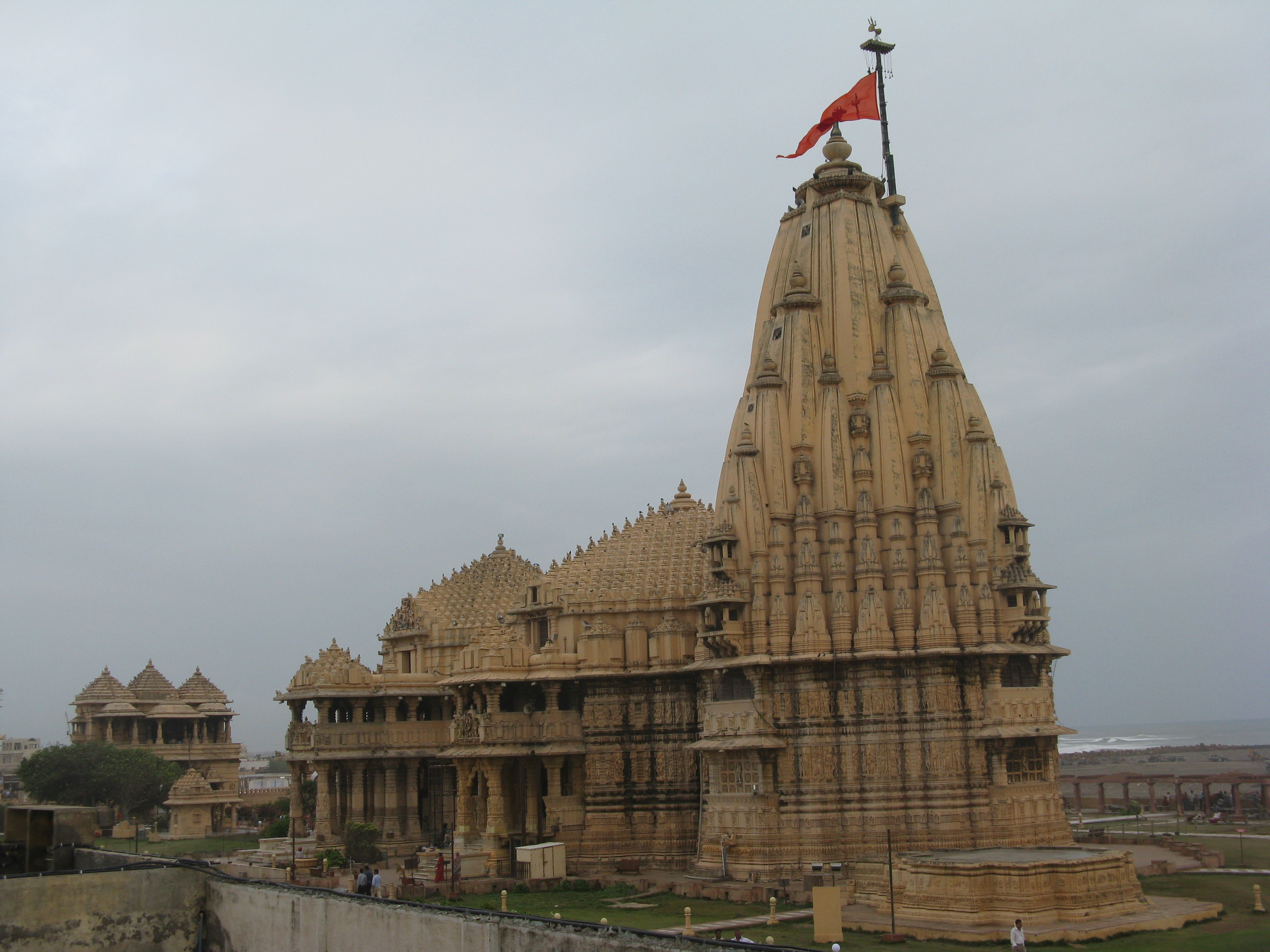
Somnath Temple at dawn

== See also ==
- Bhalka
- Conversion of non-Islamic places of worship into mosques
- Kashi Vishwanath Temple
- Dwarka
