= Prabhas Patan =

Neighborhood in Veraval, Gujarat, India

Prabhas Patan Dev Patan
- Neighborhood
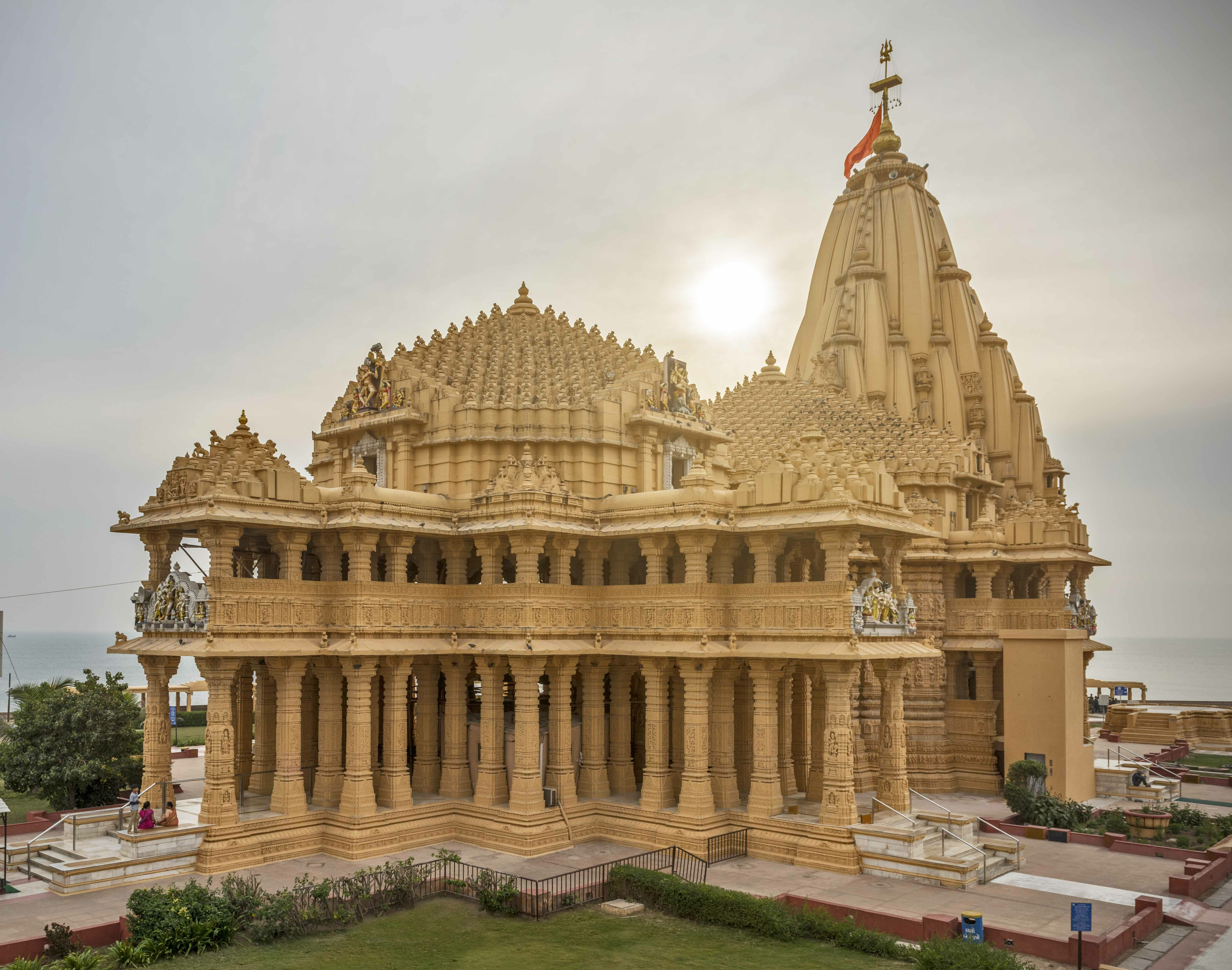
- Somnath Temple

- Location in Gujarat, India Prabhas Patan (India)
- Coordinates: 20°53′23″N 70°24′24″E
- Country: India
- State: Gujarat
- District: Gir Somnath
- City: Veraval
- Elevation: 0 m (0 ft)

Languages
  - Official: Gujarati
- Time zone: UTC+5:30 (IST)
- Vehicle registration: GJ-32

Prabhas Patan, historically named Dev Patan, is a locality in Veraval, Gujarat. As the site of the Somnath temple and its associated Jyotirlinga (an aniconic representation of the god Shiva), it is a place of Hindu pilgrimage.

== Places of interest ==
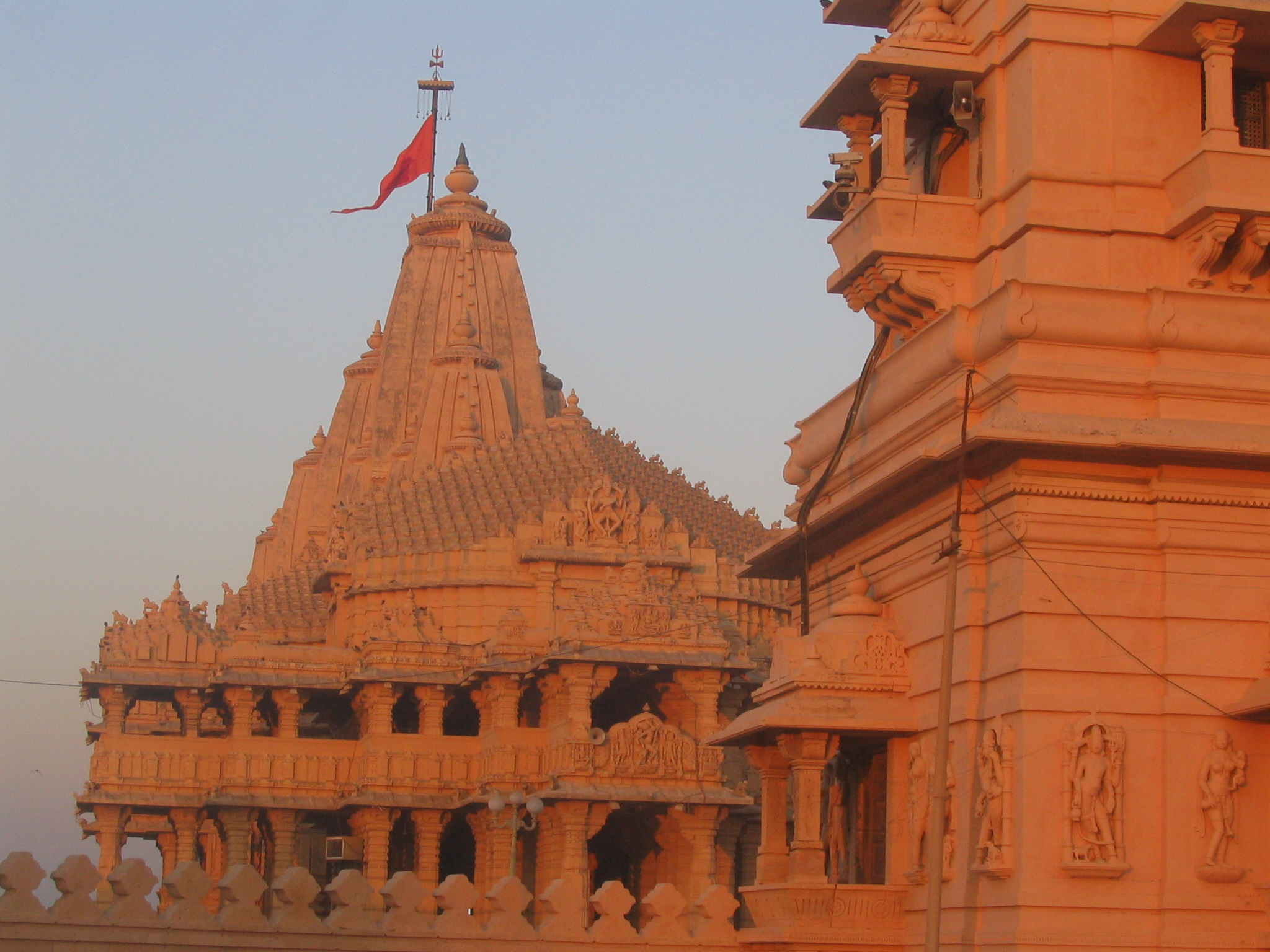
The Somnath Temple at Prabhas Patan, Veraval.

Somnath temple - One of the twelve jyotirlinga of Shiva.

Daityusudan Temple - is an ancient one with an image of Vishnu from the 7th century AD. It is located close to the Somanath Mahadev temple, Northerly. Chandraprabh Swami Jain temple lays adjacent to this temple.

Mahakali Temple - lies close Somnath Mahadev temple. It was built by Queen Ahalyabai Holkar of Indore in 1783 AD. Other spots in the temple are Shri Kapardi Vinayak and Shri Hanuman Temple in addition to Vallabhghat. Vallabhghat is a beautiful sunset point.

Prabhas Museum - Down the lane to the north of the temple is a museum with archaeological remains from the former Somnath Temple. They include remains of the ancient shrine reconstructed by the Chalukyan Maharaja Shri Mularaja Deva Solanki of Anhilvada Patan. It preserves stone sculptures, inscriptions and pottery from several periods.

Rudralay Mahadev or Rudreshvara Temple – Built in 11th or 13th century AD is located to left of the road to the Triveni Ghat.

Parsuram or Parshuram Temple – located to the right of the road to Triveni Sangam, opposite to Rudralay temple, is popular among devotees. Parshuram, the son of goddess Renuka and sage Jamadagni is believed to be the sixth incarnation of Vishnu and one of the seven immortals (Chiranjivi) as stated in Hindu mythology. The baroque temple is adjoined by two ancient bathing water tanks (holy kunds). The temple edifice is divided into three sub structures; Sabha mandap, Central mandap and a Garbhagriha. The Garbhagriha of this shrine houses the idol of Lord Parshuram sided by two idols of Kala and Kama. The temple complex also comprises the sub shrines dedicated to Hanuman and Ganesha. Additionally, a smaller shrine consecrating the Renuka is also positioned behind the main temple.

Triveni Sangam Ghat of Somnath established at the confluence of the three rivers Saraswati, Kapil and Hiran is a sacrosanct locale highly revered by Hindus as the Moksha Teerth. This is the place where the three rivers symbolising birth, life, and death flow into the Arabian Sea.

Balaramji ki Gufa (Baldev Gufa or Dauji - ni - Gufa) - An ancient holy cave known as Dauji-ni-Gufa where you can find the mark of Aadisesha depicted on the cave wall from where Balarama is said to have departed in serpent form after accompanying Sri Krisha on his final journey. This place is adjacent to the place of Sri Krishna’s Nirvana.

The Kamnath Mahadev Temple and Sharda peet – Built about 200 years ago by a Mayurdhwaj King, Kamnath Mahadev is a renowned temple located in Somnath, opposite to triveni sangam, close to suraj mandir. This is a large temple complex with a holy pond known as Dudhiyu Talav, water well known as Gangvo Kuvo and a bathing pool named as Mahadev no Kund. It is believed that Mayurdhwaj King recovered from leprosy after taking bath in this place, and devotees to this day take dip in this water for its healing powers. A huge temple of the main deity, Kamnath, occupies the center surrounded by many small structures. It is believed that ages ago Shiva had reduced Kama to ashes by unleashing the fury of his third eye, hence the name Kamanath. In the interiors, there is a long, narrow cave where Adi Shankaracharya meditated for years. A presentation of all the twelve jyotirlings of Shiva is shown at the opening of this cave.

Suraj Mandir - also popularly known as Sun Temple, in Somnath is also an ancient temple dating back to the origin of Somnath temple. This temple is situated at the north of the Triveni Ghat. The temple architecture is amazing with many images of elephants, lions and other birds and animals. There is also a step well in the temple premises. This temple too was attacked many times by Muslim foreign invaders.

Panch Pandava Gufa (Hinglaj Mata Gufa) - established near Lalghati in Somnath, close to Suraj Mandir is a cave temple that was expanded to present form in 1949 by the late Baba Narayandas. The pandav brothers, during their exile, are believed to have done penance in the caves in order to impress lord Shiva. Pandav brothers also worshiped Hinglaj Mataji along with lord Shiva here. Old temple might have been built around 15th century. Positioned at an elevated locus on a small hillock and offering the panoramic prospects of the adjoining Somnath town and the Sea, this temple is dedicated to the five Pandava brothers [narrow steps lead to the cave and temple]. Apart from the idols of Pandavas, this temple also enshrines the idols of Lord Shiva, Goddess Durga, Lord Rama, Devi Sita, Laxman and Hanuman. Set up amidst the picturesque milieu and the calm and cool spiritual ambiance, the Panch Pandava Gufa temple also accommodates a Sanskrit college in its premises. Cave here is also referred as Aravalem caves; another namesake cave located in Goa is very popular.

Gita Mandir - placed at the confluence of three holy rivers known as Triveni Tirtha. As the legend goes, the Gita Mandir is nested at the very exact spot where Lord Sri Krishna after being shot by a hunter at the Bhalka Teerth had rested for a while before departing for His ‘Neej Dham’ at Dehotsarg. Lord Krishna with his bleeding foot is said to have walked about 4 km from Bhalka Teerth to this location. Marvelously built in polished marble stone, the Gita Mandir enshrines the idol of Lord Krishna in its sanctum. This idol of the presiding deity is flanked by two statues of Lord Laxminarayan and Lord SitaRam. The footprint of Lord Shri Krishna is carved here to mark the divine memory of Shri Krishna Neejdham Prasthan Leela. The most remarkable aspect of the Gita Mandir is its eighteen marble pillars that bear the 18 Adhyays of Shrimad Bhagwat Geeta carved on them. The interiors of the temple are decorated with several paintings depicting various life episodes of Lord Krishna. The Gita Mandir is constructed in such a way that any sound made within the temple is echoed. As a result, the Krishna Bhajans and Stotras recited inside the temple echo in the environment and create a spiritual appeal.

Lakshminarayan Temple - located adjacent to the Gita Mandir along river Hiren is dedicated to Lord Vishnu and Goddess Laxmi. Positioned along the pristine Beachside this Mandir is revered for enshrining the divine ‘Shree vigraha’ of Bhagwan Laxminarayan. Supposed to be fashioned after the Laxminarayan Temple of Badrinath, this temple is built in modern Indian style of architecture. This daunting structure erected in glossy marbles and ornamented with beautiful carvings and engravings is distinguished for its commanding architectonics. The carvings on the temple walls depict the episodes chronicled in the Hindu Puranas. Apart from the idol of Lord Laxminarayan, this temple also enshrines several other idols of various Hindu Gods and Goddesses.

Shree Mahaprabhuji Bethakji - is located close to Gita Mandir. At the Dehotsargt Tirth Shri Vallabhacharya gave discourses on Shrimad Bhagvat Gita for seven days, and this place is 65th of such 84 bethakjis.

Bhimnath Mahadev – located little North of Gita Mandir is yet another small ancient temple, which was ransacked by Muslim rulers in past.

Shree Veneshwar Mahadev Temple dedicated to Lord Shiv – located in center of town opposite the Somnath Trust Dharamshala Gate, can also be reached Westerly from Dholeshvar mandir on a narrow path. The Rajputa "Vaja" clan was in charge of Somnath during the Muslim desecrations. As the legend goes, when Mahmud of Ghazni invaded Somnath in 1025 AD, the king gave him a tough resistance. As the king was not surrendering, Mahmud of Ghazni hatched a new plan. He found out that the king had a daughter named Veni who used to pay a visit to this Shiva Temple stationed outside the fort wall of Prabhas Patan every day. Mahmud of Ghazni decided that he would kidnap Veni and then force the king to yield. When the soldiers of Gazani attempted so later, the Shiv ling spontaneously got divided and the princess got buried into it. The Shiv temple here since then is known as "Veneshwar temple". The prints of the Veni as well as the marks of the Shiva Lingam being split open can still be seen on the Lingam here. This episode of Princess Veni’s deliverance is eulogized in his novel by the prolific Gujarati novelist K M Munshi.

Prabhas Buddhist Caves are very ancient caves, located North-west of Dholeshwar, close to highway.
