= Battle of Ranpur =

15th century battle in Gujarat

| Date | Unknown (Note: The date of Mahmud's conquest of Ranpur is uncertain.) |
| Location | Ranpur, Botad district, Gujarat 22.354°N 71.718°E |
| Result | Gujarat Sultanate victory |
| Territorial changes | Ranpur annexed to Gujarat Sultanate |

Belligerents
| Gujarat Sultanate | Gohil dynasty |

Commanders and leaders
| Mahmud Begada; Bhandari Khan † | Ranji II † |

Strength
| Unknown | Unknown |

Casualties and losses
| Unknown | Heavy |
- Location within Gujarat Battle of Ranpur (India)

The Battle of Ranpur was a late-15th-century military engagement led by Sultan Mahmud Begada of the Gujarat Sultanate against the Gohil chief Ranji II, who held Ranpur as a feudatory. Ranji Gohil was defeated and killed in battle, after which Ranpur was annexed into the Sultanate.

According to the bardic chronicle Ras Mala, during one occasion the Sultan's queen faced insult by her sister Thakorani who was also Ranaji's wife over her sister's marriage to a Muslim. Tensions rose further when an elderly Muslim woman's son was executed by Ranaji for publicly offering prayer. She then sought justice from the Sultan, hardening his resolve to act. Mahmud Begada sent his nephew Bhandari Khan against Ranpur. Ranaji met the army near Dhandhuka, was driven back to the fort. Ranaji and Bhandari Khan were both killed while the Ranis committed suicide. The fort was captured by the Sultan's forces.

In the aftermath, Ranaji's nephew Haluji Parmar, chief of Muli, converted to Islam and was granted Ranpur. A younger brother of Ranaji likewise embraced Islam receiving grants.

== Background ==
In 1420, the Gohil dynasty was subjugated into paying tribute to Gujarat Sultanate. For nearly a century and a half, the Gohil chiefs ruled at Umrala (21°50′39.6″N 71°48′17.3″E) as minor chieftains under Gujarat's direct controlled territory. Over the periods, several branches of the Gohil dynasty emerged and established across Kathiawar.

Ranpur was ruled held by Gohil chief Ranji II as a feudatory of the Sultans of Gujarat. According to the bardic chronicle Ras Mala, It is said that Ranji and Mahmud Begada had married daughters of the Raja of Marwar. Once, while visiting her father's house, the queen met Thakorani, wife of the Gohil chief. She pressed her younger sister to dine with her. The Gohil's wife declined, saying: "You have married the king, and my husband is his servant; I am therefore not worthy to sit at dinner with you." When she continued to insist, the other finally confessed the true reason stating she would lose caste by eating with the queen, who had married a Muslim. The queen was greatly offended and resolved to have her sister to dine with her at court. She complained the Sultan of the insult and take up the matter. Mahmud invited Ranji to come to Ahmadabad. After arriving the Sultan asked Ranji to bring his wife to the palace for a visit. Sultan acquired some of the Ranji's personal tokens under a minor pretext. He secretly gave the symbols to Ranji's former servant, instructing him to deliver them to the chief's wife with a forged message summoning her to Ahmedabad. The queen complied and travelled to meet her husband. Upon her arrival, Ranaji immediately realized a trap was being set. He cleverly substituted another woman in her place and safely escorted his wife back to Ranpur. Around the same time, an elderly Muslim woman and her son, who were on their way to Mecca for Hajj, stayed one night in Ranpur. The next day the boy began loudly to recite the Islamic call to prayer at the dawn. The Brahmins of the town, on hearing this, hurried to the chief and told him that this unusual event was an omen that his sovereignty would soon pass to the mleccha. Enraged, the Gohil imprisoned the boy. Despite the mother begging to free, Ranji ordered him to be put to death. The woman then returned to Ahmedabad and sought justice from Sultan Mahmud Begada. This increased the Sultan's resentment against Ranji.

== Battle ==
Mahmud Begada decided to march against Ranpur. Bhandari Khan, the nephew of Sultan Mahmud, had married that same day. He volunteered to lead the expedition against Ranpur. Ranaji II met the Sultan's army at Dhandhuka. A desperate battle ensued. The Gohel chief was defeated and driven back to the gates of Ranpur. From there he sent word to his wives that if they saw his royal banner fall, they should understand that he had been slain and should commit suicide rather than fall into the hands of the enemies. As the fighting continued, the standard-bearer felt thirsty. He set the emblem down for a moment to drink water. The Ranis, believing this to be the fatal signal, threw themselves into a well inside the fort and died. Shortly afterwards Ranaji himself fell in battle. The Sultan's troops then took possession of the fort. Their young commander, Bhandari Khan was slain in the battle too.

== Aftermath ==
Nephew of Ranji, Haluji Parmar, chief of Muli converted to Islam. As a reward, Mahmud Begada offered Haluji several parganas, but he asked for the town of Ranpur, which was granted. Ranij's younger brother also converted to Islam and founded one of the branches of the Dholka Kasbatis. He received 24 villages of Botad, which his descendants held for several generations. Haluji begged for a grant on copper plate to confirm his title, the Sultan assured him that it was unnecessary since the fact of his conversion to Islam was not likely to be forgotten. He is the founder of the family of the present Ranpur Molesalams.

== See also ==
- Siege of Barur
- Conquest of Dwarka
- Conquest of Junagadh
- Siege of Champaner
- Sack of Kuva

== Bibliography ==
- Dosabhai, Edalji (1986) [1894]. A History of Gujarat (PDF). Kessinger Publishing. ISBN 978-1-4367-3303-8.
- Commissariat, M. S. (1938). A History of Gujarat. Vol. I. Ahmadabad: Longmans Green & Co. Ltd.
- Trivedi, R. K., ed. (1969). Gujarat State Gazetteers: Bhavnagar. Directorate of Government Print., Stationery and Publications, Gujarat State.
- Bano, Ajaz (1984). "The Zamindars in the Sultanate of Gujrat: 1407-1572". Proceedings of the Indian History Congress. 45: 337–344. ISSN 2249-1937.
