= Sack of Kuva =

1486 conflict in Gujarat

Date	19 April 1487
Location	Kuva (present-day Kankavati) in Surendranagar district, Gujarat 23°4′17″N 71°21′27″E
Result	Gujarat Sultanate victory

Belligerents
Gujarat Sultanate	Kingdom of Jhalavad

Commanders and leaders
Mahmud Begada; Mirza Khalil Khan	Vaghoji Jhala †; Nathoji †; Mepji †; Sagramji †; Jodhaji †; Ajoji †; Ramsinghji †

Strength
Large	Unknown

Casualties and losses
Unknown	Heavy; Vaghoji Jhala, 6 princes, many officers killed; 13 Ranis committed Jauhar
- Location within Gujarat Sack of Kuva (India)

The Sack of Kuva also known as Kuva-no-Kehr, was an expedition against the Kingdom of Jhalavad by Gujarat Sultanate under Sultan Mahmud Begada in April 1487, resulting effective destruction of the Jhala capital of Kuva (present day Kankavati) in Surendranagar district, Gujarat. The event followed a rebellion by Vaghoji Jhala against the Sultanate's authority. Mirza Khalil Khan, the governor of Sorath (Kathiawar) was dispatched to quell the rebellion. The Rajputs gained victory over Mirza Khalil Khan near Saidpur. The Sultan himself directed expedition and laid siege to Kuva. When provisions ran short, Vaghoji led a sortie. During the fighting his banner was lowered, prompting the Ranis and others to believe the defeat of the Jhalas. They drowned themselves in a well in an act of Sati. Vaghoji returned to the fort, learned of their fate, and re-entered the battle, where he was killed along with most of his principal officers and six of his sons. The Gujarati forces then sacked the town, which permanently ceased to be the Jhala capital. The remaining royal family settled in the capital at Halvad in 1488 AD.

== Background ==
Since the foundation, Gujarat Sultanate controlled small territories of land. Most surrounding regions remained under powerful local chiefs like those of Junagadh, Champaner, Jhalavad, Idar, Bagar, Dungarpur, Siddhpur and Nandod who paid tribute but retained significant autonomy rather than submitting fully. In 1408 Ranmalsinghji (r. 1392–1408) died, and his son Satarsalji Jhala (r. 1408–1420) ascended to the throne. Satarji rebelled two times against Sultan Ahmad Shah I of Gujarat but was reduced every time. Satarji maintained communication with Hoshang Shah of the Malwa Sultanate. In 1413–14, Ahmad Shah anxious of this alliance invaded Jhalavad. Satarji sought help to Hoshang Shah who marched into Gujarat. Ahmad Shah immediately abandoned the Jhalavad campaign, returned to central Gujarat. Satarji Jhala, being frightened, broke the alliance with Hoshang Shah. He sought refuge to Chudasama ruler Rao Malingdeva of Junagadh. Subsequently, the Malwa sultan getting no help of the Rajput state withdrew to his territory. In 1416 four principalities of Idar, Champaner, Jhalavad and Nandod formed a confederacy against Ahmad Shah and invited the assistance of Sultan Hoshang. Hoshang advanced with an army as far as Modasa, but Ahmad Shah, by forced marches, reached the same place first. Unwilling to risk a battle, Hoshang retired to his own capital, and the confederate rajas were compelled to retire to their principalities. Ahmad Shah died in 1442 leaving the full subjugation of Jhalavad incomplete. Gujarat only asserted suzerainty over Jhalavad.

== Conflict ==
In 1486, Vaghoji Jhala of Jhalavad rebelled against Gujarat Sultanate. The 12-year-old prince Mirza Khalil Khan, the youngest son of Mahmud Begada, who was the governor of Sorath, marched against the rebel. On 21 March 1487, the two forces met near the village of Saidpur, six miles north of Dhrangadhra. A fierce battle followed, resulting in a victory for the Rajput forces. Mirza Khalil Khan then appealed to his father for assistance. Sultan Mahmud Begada assembled a large army and laid siege on Kuva. Vaghoji Jhala assembled all his vassals and decided to defend the fort. The garrison was soon reduced as the provisions run short. Eventually Vaghoji decided to fight on open grounds. Before leaving the fort, Vaghoji instructed the guards of the women's apartments to watch his banner closely. If it fell which would indicate decisive defeat therefore the Ranis were to immolate themselves at once. The Rajputs would then sally out, resolved either to defeat the enemy or to die fighting. During the fighting the standard-bearer, exhausted, set the banner down. Seeing this, the guards began to carry out their orders. On hearing the news, the thirteen Ranis threw themselves into a well and were drowned. Meanwhile, after desperate fighting, Vaghoji Jhala managed to return to Kuva. On hearing of the Ranis' fate, he resolved to fight again and die in the battlefield. After killing many soldiers, he was himself killed, together with most of his principal officers on 19 April 1487. Six out of twelve sons of Vaghoji viz. Nathoji, Mepji, Sagramji, Jodhaji, Ajoji and Ramsinghji were slain too. The Gujarati army sacked Kuva and from that date ceased to be the Jhala capital. The incident known as 'Kuva-no-Kehr' (transl. 'the catastrophe of Kuva') is still proverbial among the Jhalas for great loss.

== Aftermath ==
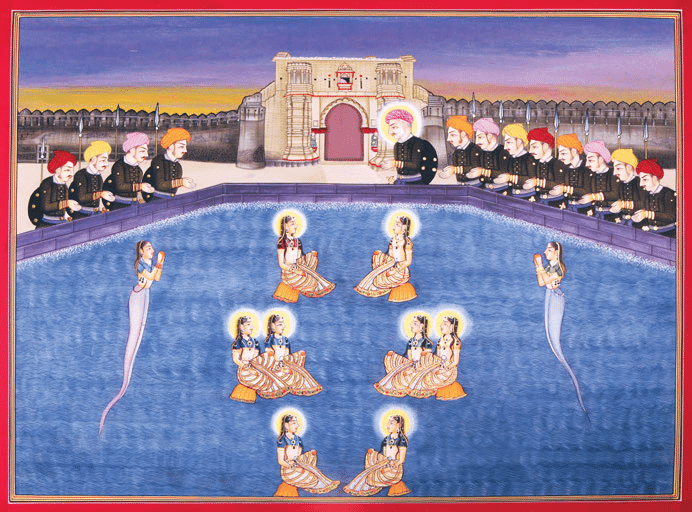
The Ranis of Vaghoji Jhala sacrificing themselves at Kuva.

On learning of Vaghoji's death, Sahebkunvarba, the daughter of the Solanki ruler of Kalaria, committed Sati. She at the time had not yet married but betrothed. Sultan Mahmud Begada established a military thana and a mosque at Kuva. After the fall of Kuva, the Jhalas were forced to seek a new capital. In 1487, Rajodharji, the eight and eldest surviving son of Vaghoji, together with his remaining brothers, left Kuva following the deaths of their father and elder brothers. He selected the site for his capital on which Halvad now stands. According to tradition, one day shortly after Kuva's capture, while Rajodharji was out hunting, a hare emerged from the jungle and faced him instead of fleeing. He attributed the animal's unusual courage to the excellence of the soil and, on 10 February 1488, founded Halvad near that spot. He reigned as Jhaleshwar until 1500 AD.

== See also ==
- Siege of Barur
- Conquest of Junagadh
- Conquest of Dwarka
- Siege of Champaner
- Mahmud Begada's campaign of Kutch
- Mahmud Begada's campaign of Sindh

== Bibliography ==
- Chaube, J. (1975). History of the Gujarat Kingdom. New Delhi: Munshiram Manoharlal. ISBN 978-81-215-0295-5.
- Commissariat, M. S. (1938). A History of Gujarat. Vol. I. Ahmadabad: Longmans Green & Co. Ltd.
- Day, Upendra Nath (1965). Medieval Malwa: A Political and Cultural History, 1401-1562. Munshi Ram Manohar Lal. ISBN 978-81-215-0401-0.
- Dosabhai, Edalji (1986) [1894]. A History of Gujarat (PDF). Kessinger Publishing. ISBN 978-1-4367-3303-8.
- McLeod, John (2017). The Making of Jhallesvar Genealogy: Interpreting Dynastic History in Western India, c.1090–2016. Research Gate.
- Misra, Satish Chandra (1995). Rise of Muslim Power in Gujarat: History of Gujarat 1298-1442. Munshiram Manoharlal Publishers Pvt. Limited. ISBN 978-81-215-0169-9.
- Rajyaghor, S. B. (1977). Gujarat State Gazetteers: Surendranagar District. Directorate of Government Print., Stationery and Publications, Gujarat State.
- Wilberforce-Bell, Harold (1916). The History of Kathiawad from the Earliest Times. W. Heinemann.
