= Mahmud Begada's campaign of Kutch =

1472 conflict in Kutch

Date	February–March 1472
Location	Rann of Kutch and Tharparkar
Result	Gujarat Sultanate victory
Territorial changes	Status quo ante bellum

Belligerents
Gujarat Sultanate	Local landlords of Kutch

Commanders and leaders
Mahmud Begada	Local landlords

Strength
600 cavalry	24,000

Casualties and losses
Unknown	Many killed

Mahmud Begada's campaign of Kutch (1472) was a short military campaign led by Sultan Mahmud Begada of the Gujarat Sultanate against the local landlords of Kutch. After the conquest of Junagadh, Mahmud sought to assert his authority over Kutch, a region whose rulers had long paid intermittent tribute to Gujarat while remaining largely independent. Motivated also by reports of the persecution of Muslims and a desire to spread Islam, he marched in February–March 1472. Crossing the Rann of Kutch with a large army, he left the main force behind due to the difficult marshy terrain and advanced with only 600 cavalry. At Thar he defeated a force of 24,000 local troops. The landlords then sued for peace. Mahmud accepted tribute without annexing the infertile and frequently flooded territory. He later took some local ignorat Muslims to Mustafabad for proper religious instruction before turning his attention to a campaign in Sindh.

== Background ==
The Rann of Kuth were mainly inhabited by the Rajputs of the Soomra, Sodah and Kolhora clans. The Kingdom of Kutch had long thrown off their allegiance to the Delhi Sultanate. In 1410 Muzaffar Shah I had defeated Dadarji, ruler of Kanthkot then part of Kutch. Since then, Kutch remained under the suzerainty of the rulers of Gujarat for seventy‑three years, until 1510 AD. In these times the rulers of Kutch had paid tribute to the Sultans of Gujarat, though they remained practically independent. After conquest of Junagadh, Mahmud Begada turned his attention to Kutch, which he regarded as part of his kingdom. He wanted to assert his authority over the small state. Lately the Kutchis had invaded Gujarat. According to Firishta, as a champion of Islam, Sultan Mahmud wished to spread Islam there. He had planned the expedition after the conquest of Champaner, complaints came from southern Sindh that the Muslims were being persecuted by the Hindus. Viewing it as a moral duty to protect the Muslims of Kutch, Sultan Mahmud resolved to invade Kutch earlier than planned.

== Campaign ==
In February–March 1472, Sultan Mahmud himself led the expedition at the head of a large army. He crossed the Rann of Kutch without difficulty, but further progress through the marshy region with a large force proved extremely hard. He therefore left the main army behind and advanced with only 600 cavalry. After a harsh journey of 120 miles he reached Thar and Parkar. Hearing the Sultan's invasion the local landlords gathered an army of 24,000 troops. Sultan Mahmud dismounted and ordered his cavalry to put on their armour. Despite being outnumbered, he attacked with such force that the enemy's formation collapsed. The poorly trained troops of the local landlords could not withstand well trained Gujarati assault. Their ranks broke and fled while many killed in the rout. The landlords being defeated, sent envoys to sue for peace. As he had only a small force of six hundred horsemen with him, and it was impossible under the circumstances to bring up the main army he had left behind. Having already advanced deep into enemy territory, a refusal of the peace offer could have placed him in a difficult position, as the landlords might not have allowed him a safe retreat. From an economic standpoint, annexing Kutch offered little advantage. The land was largely infertile, remaining under water for much of the year because of heavy rains and high tides, and was unsuitable for cultivation. Only salt and fish were readily available. Maintaining a strong standing army in such marshy terrain would be very difficult. Therefore, Mahmud accepted their proposal and received tributes from them without any counter demands.

== Aftermath ==
Sultan Mahmud stayed there for some time and made contact with local Muslims. They were Ibahatiyas unaware of Sharia, intermarried and lived as Hindus. Seeing it as his duty to protect them from Hindu influence, he invited some to accompany him to Mustafabad so they could properly learn the tenets of Islam. There he appointed ulamas to educate them. A few later returned home after receiving instruction, while most remained and took up various posts at the court. They received titles and jagirs too. Next, Sultan Mahmud carried out campaign in Sindh to aid his maternal grandfather Jam Nizamuddin II against rebels.

== See also ==
- Mahmud Begada's campaign of Sindh
- Conquest of Dwarka
- Arab conquest of Sindh
- Mongol invasion of Sindh
- British conquest of Sindh

== Bibliography ==
- Chaube, J. (1975). History of Gujarat Kingdom, 1458-1537. Munshiram Manoharlal Publishers. ISBN 978-0-88386-573-6.
- Dosabhai, Edalji (1986) [1894]. A History of Gujarat (PDF). Kessinger Publishing. ISBN 978-1-4367-3303-8.
- Haig, W. (1928). The Cambridge History of India: Turks and Afghans, edited by W. Haig. Vol. III. Cambridge University Press.
- Majumdar, Ramesh Chandra (1967) [1960]. The History and Culture of the Indian People. Vol. 6 (2nd ed.). Bombay: Bharatiya Vidya Bhavan.
- Habib, Mohammad; Nizami, Khaliq Ahmad (1970). A Comprehensive History of India. Vol. 5, Part 2. People's Publishing House.
- Patel, G. D. (1971). Gujarat State Gazetteers: Kutch. Directorate of Government Print., Stationery and Publications, Gujarat State.
