= Mahmud Begada =

Sultan of Gujarat from 1459 to 1511

Mahmud Shah I
- Sultan al-Barr; Sultan al-Bahr; Khudaigan-i-Halim

7th Sultan of Gujarat
- Vizier: See list: Malik Shaban (1458–1461); Malik Haji Sultani (1461–?); Malik Baha-ud-din (1466–1471); Muhafiz Khan (1471–fl. 1492)
- Reign: 18 June 1459 – 23 November 1511
- Predecessor: Daud Shah
- Successor: Muzaffar Shah II
- Born: Fateh Khan; 20 December 1445; Ahmedabad, Gujarat Sultanate (present-day Gujarat, India)
- Died: 23 November 1511 (aged 65); Ahmedabad, Gujarat Sultanate (present-day Gujarat, India)
- Burial: Sarkhej Roza, Ahmedabad
- Spouse: Rani Rupamanjhari; Rani Sarani; Rani Hirabai; Two daughters of Raval Jayasingh of Champaner; A Rajput princess of Marwar
- Issue: Muhammad Kala; Apa Khan; Ahmed Khan; Muzaffar Shah II; A daughter, married Hasan Khan of Khandesh
Names
- Abu'l Fath Nasir-ud-Din Mahmud Shah I
- Dynasty: Muzaffarid dynasty of Gujarat
- Father: Muhammad Shah II
- Mother: Bibi Mughali
- Religion: Sunni Islam
- Military career
- Service years: c. 1459–1511
- Conflicts: Battle of Ahmedabad (1459); Siege of Barur (1464); Battle of Sanjan (1465/90) (disputed); Conquest of Junagadh (1467–1470); Campaign of Kutch (1472); Campaign of Sindh (1472); Conquest of Dwarka (1473); Siege of Champaner (1483–1484); Sack of Kuva (1487); Battle of Ranpur (Unknown); Campaign of Khandesh and Daulatabad (1498–1500); Khandesh war of succession (1508–1509)

Abu'l Fath Nasir-ud-Din Mahmud Shah I (Note: Gujarati: અબુલ ફત નાસીર ઉદ દિન મહમુદ શાહ) (20 December 1445 – 23 November 1511), better known as Mahmud Begada, was the Sultan of Gujarat from 1459 until his death in 1511. He is considered the greatest and most renowned Sultan of Gujarat. Raised to the throne at the age of 13, he successfully conquered Pavagadh, Junagadh and Dwarka, and established Champaner as the capital.

== Names ==
His full name was Abu'l Fath Nasir-ud-Din Mahmud Shah I. He was born Fat'h Khan, also spelled Fateh Khan. He titled himself Sultan al-Barr, Sultan al-Bahr, literally 'sultan of the land, sultan of the sea'.

For his surname Begra or Begarh/Begarha two theories have been proposed:

1. From his mustachios being large and twisted like a bullock's horn, such a bullock being called Begado.
2. That the word comes from the Gujarati be, two, and gadh, a fort, the people giving him this title in honour of his capture of two forts; Junagadh of Girnar (1472) and Pavagadh of Champaner (1484).

== Early life ==
Mahmud was born on 20 December 1445 in Ahmedabad. On the death of Qutb-ud-Din Ahmad Shah II, the nobles raised to the throne his uncle Daud Khan, son of Ahmad Shah I. Daud appointed "low-born men", Hindus and recent converts to Islam, to high offices and committed improper acts, hence within a short period of seven or twenty-seven days, he was deposed. In 1459 his half-brother Fateh Khan, the son of Muhammad Shah II by Bibi Mughali, a daughter of Jam Tughlaq or Jam Nizamuddin II of Samma dynasty ruling from Thatta in Sindh; (Note: In the genealogy of the rulers of Sindh there was no Jam Juna. It was possibly Jam Nizamuddin II who gave his daughter to Muhammad Shah II.) was seated on the throne at the age of little more than thirteen with the title of Mahmud Shah I.

The close connection of Fateh Khan with the saintly Shah Alam is frequently mentioned by with Gujarat chroniclers. According to the Mirat-i-Sikandari of his two daughters the Jam intended Bibi Mughali the more beautiful for the Saint and Bibi Mirghi the less comely for the Sultan. By bribing the Jam's envoys the king secured the prettier sister. The enraged Saint was consoled by his father who said: My son, to you will come both the cow and the calf. After Muhammad Shah II's death, fear of Qutb-ud-din Ahmad Shah II's designs against the young Fateh Khan forced Bibi Mughali to seek safety with her sister, and on her sister's death she married the Saint. Qutb-ud-din made several attempts to seize Fateh Khan. But by the power of the Saint when Qutb-ud-din attempted to seize him, Fateh Khan in body as well as in dress became a girl. According to one account Qutb-ud-din met his death in an attempt to carry off Fateh Khan. As he rode a mad camel, the king struck at the phantom, and his sword cleaving the air gashed his knee. This was the Saint's sword, which against his will, for he knew it would be the death of the king, Qutb-ud-din forced Shah Alam to bind round him before the battle of Kapadvanj against Mahmud Khalji of Malwa Sultanate.

== Reign ==
=== Early years ===
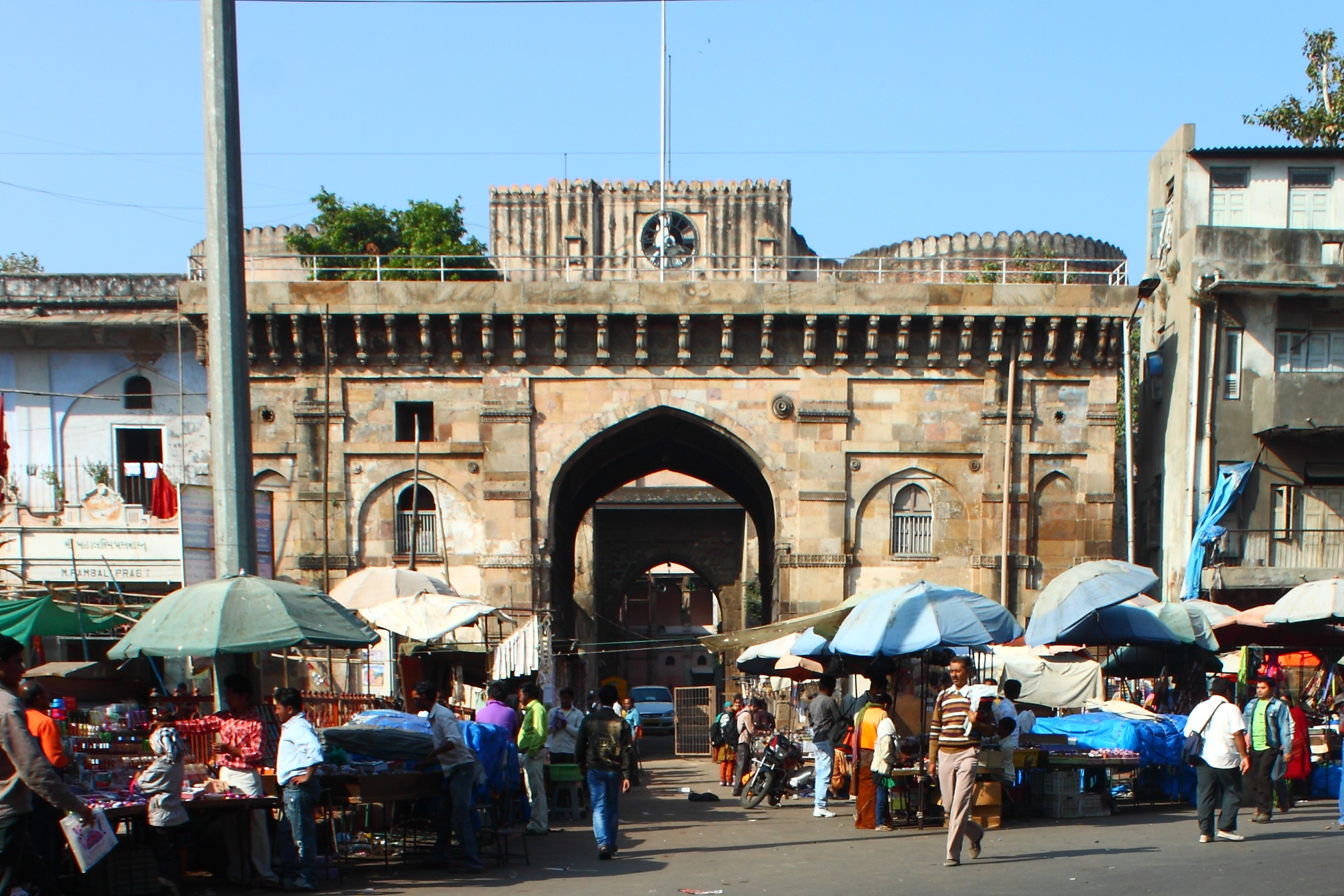
Gate of Bhadra Fort

On Sunday, 18 June 1459, Fateh Khan ascended the throne and assumed the title of Mahmud Shah. The coronation was marked by royal festivities, with titles, robes of honour, Arabian horses, embroidered belts and swords distributed among the nobles. According to Nizamuddin Ahmad, one crore tankas were also given out in charity.

Shortly after certain of the nobles including Saiful Mulk, Kabir-ud-din Sultani surnamed Akd-ul-Mulk, Burhan-ul-Mulk and Hisam-ul-Mulk represented to the Sultan that the minister Shaaban Imad-ul-Mulk contemplated treason and wished to set his son on the throne. Having seized and imprisoned the minister in the Bhadra Fort and set five hundred of their trusted retainers as guards over him, the rebels retired to their homes. At nightfall Abdullah, the chief of the elephant stables, going to the young Sultan represented to him that the nobles who had imprisoned Imad-ul-Mulk were the real traitors and had determined to place Habib Khan, an uncle of the Sultan's, on the throne. The Sultan consulting his mother and some of his faithful friends ordered Abdullah at daybreak to equip all his elephants in full armour and draw them up in the square before the Bhadra. He then seated himself on the throne and in a voice of feigned anger ordered one of the courtiers to bring out Shaaban Imad-ul-Mulk, that he might wreak his vengeance upon him. As these orders were not obeyed the Sultan rose, and walking up the Bhadra called: "Bring out Shaaban!" The guards brought forth Imad-ul-Mulk, and the Sultan ordered his fetters to be broken. Some of the nobles' retainers made their submission to the Sultan, others fled and hid themselves. In the morning, hearing what had happened, the refractory nobles marched against the Sultan. Many advised the Sultan to cross the Sabarmati River by the postern gate and retire from the city, and, after collecting an army, to march against the nobles. Giving no ear to these counsels the young Sultan ordered Abdullah to charge the advancing nobles with his six hundred elephants. The charge dispersed the malcontents who fled and either hid themselves in the city or betook themselves to the country. Some were killed, some were trampled by the Sultan's orders under the elephants' feet, and one was pardoned.

=== Intervention in Malwa–Bahmani Wars ===
In 1462, according to Firishta, Nizam Shah Bahmani (r. 1461–1463), the sultan of the Bahmani Sultanate in Deccan, whose country had been invaded by Sultan Mahmud Khalji of the Malwa Sultanate, applied for help to the Gujarat king. Mahmud Shah at once started to Nizam Shah's aid, and on his way receiving another equally pressing letter from the Deccan sovereign, and being joined by the Bahmani general Khwajah Jahan Gawan, he pushed on with all speed by way of Burhanpur. When Sultan Mahmud Khalji heard of his approach, he retired to his own country by way of Gondwana, from thirst and from the attacks of the Gonds, losing 5,000 to 6,000 men. The Sultan of Gujarat, after receiving the thanks of the Deccan sovereign, returned to his own dominions. In 1462, Sultan Mahmud Khalji made another incursion into the Deccan at the head of 90,000 horse, plundering and laying waste the country as far as Daulatabad. Again, the Deccan sovereign applied for help to Mahmud Shah, and on hearing of Mahmud's advance the Malwa Sultan retired a second time to his own dominions. Mahmud Shah wrote to the Malwa Sultan to desist from harassing the Deccan, threatening, in case of refusal, to march at once upon Mandu. His next expedition was against the pirate zamindars of the hill fort of Barur and the bandar of Dun or Dahanu, whose fort he took, and after imposing an annual tribute allowed the chief to continue to hold his hundred villages.

=== Campaign of Barur ===
The principality of Barur, near the port of Daman, was a base for local piracy that disrupted maritime trade. Sultan Mahmud Begada sought to secure it to protect merchant shipping, block Portuguese advances, and assert political control. In 1464, Mahmud personally led the siege with large arms crossing the difficult terrain. After a prolonged stalemate marked by fierce resistance and repeated skirmishes, neither side could gain a decisive advantage. The garrison had taken refuge in the hill-fortress utilizing the difficult terrain. Sultan Mahmud then personally led a detachment of soldiers up the steep hills, catching the defenders completely by surprise. His spread panic among the troops, breaking their morale. The Hindu chief of Barur surrendered, sending his mother to present the fort keys. Treating the chief generously, Mahmud declined presents, granted him a khilat and golden belt, restored the fort, and imposed only an annual tribute. He avoided full annexation to prevent alliances among smaller Hindu rulers until major strongholds like Junagadh and Champaner were secured, then returned victorious to his capital.

=== Conquest of Junagadh ===
Mahmud Shah next turned his thoughts to the conquest of the mountain citadel, Uparkot, of Girnar hill near Junagadh in Sorath (now in Saurashtra region of Gujarat). In 1467, he attacked the fort of Junagadh, and receiving the submission of Ra Mandalika III, the Chudasama ruler, returned to his capital. In the following year, hearing that the Junagadh chief continued to visit his temple in state with a golden umbrella and other ensigns of royalty, Mahmud despatched an army to Junagadh, and the chief sent the umbrella to the king, accompanied by fitting presents. In 1469, Mahmud once more sent an army to ravage Sorath, with the intention of finally conquering both Junagadh and Girnar. While Mahmud was on the march the Ra Mandalika suddenly joined him, and asking why the Sultan was so bent on his destruction when he had committed no fault, agreed to do whatever Mahmud might command. The king replied there is no fault like infidelity, and ordered the Ra to embrace Islam. The chief, now thoroughly alarmed, fled by night and made his way into Girnar. In 1472–73, after a siege of nearly two years, forced by the failure of his stores, he quit the fort and handed the keys to the king, converted to Islam. Though the Ra's life was spared, Sorath from this date became a crown possession, and was governed by an officer appointed by the king and stationed at Junagadh.

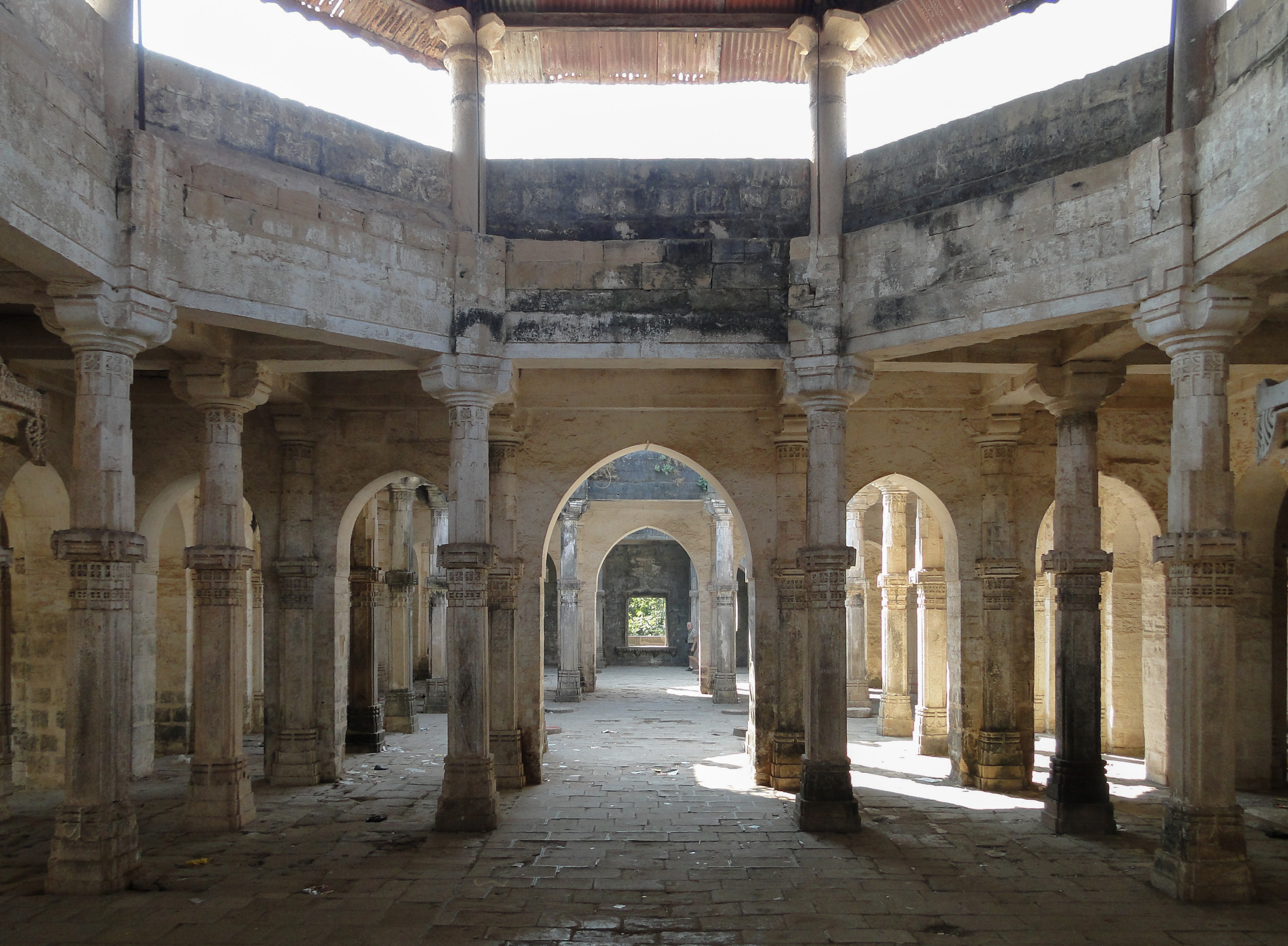
Jama Masjid of Uparkot at Junagadh was built by Begada

At the close of the war, in 1479, Mahmud Shah repaired the fort Jehanpanah, the present outer or town wall of Junagadh, and, charmed with the beauty of the neighbourhood, settled Sayyids and learned men at Junagadh and other towns in Sorath. He induced the nobles to build houses, himself raised a palace and made the new city his capital under the name of Mustafabad and enforced his claims as overlord on all the neighbouring chiefs. In the times of Ahmad Shah I, these chieftains, including even the Junagadh Ra himself, had paid tribute. But Mahmud established rule so firmly that the duty of collecting the tribute was entrusted to an officer permanently settled in the country. The author of the Mirat-i-Sikandari dilates on the dense woods round Junagadh, full of mango, raen, jambu, gular, amli, and aonla trees (Mangifera indica, Mimusops hexandra, Eugenia jambolana, Ficus glomerata, Tamarindus indica, and Emblica officinalis.), and notes that this forest tract was inhabited by Khants.

In 1480, when Mahmud Shah was at Junagadh, Khudawand Khan and others, who were weary of the king's constant warfare, incited his eldest son Ahmed Khan to assume royal power. But Imad-ul-Mulk, by refusing to join, upset their plans, and on the king's return the conspiracy was stamped out.

=== Campaign of Kutch ===
The kingdom of Kutch had long thrown off allegiance to the Delhi Sultanate. Since 1410 the rulers of Kutch continued to pay tribute to Gujarat while remaining practically independent. After conquering Junagadh, Mahmud Begada turned to Kutch, which he regarded as part of his kingdom. The Kutchi raided into Gujarat. Mahmud received complaints that Muslims were being persecuted by Hindus. He also wished to spread Islam there. In February–March 1472 Mahmud led a large army across the Rann of Kutch. Finding the marshy terrain difficult for a large force, he left the main army behind and pushed on with only 600 cavalry. After a 120-mile march he reached Thar and Parkar. Local landlords raised 24,000 men against him. Despite being heavily outnumbered, Mahmud's well-trained cavalry broke the enemy formation. The poorly trained Kutchi troops fled and many were killed. The defeated landlords sued for peace. Mahmud accepted their submission and tribute without further demands. He stayed for a time, met local Muslims who intermarried and lived as Hindus. He bought some of them to Mustafabad for proper Islamic instruction. Few later returned to their home. Most of them remained at court, receiving titles and jagirs. Mahmud then moved on to a campaign in Sind to support his maternal grandfather, Jam Nizamuddin II, against rebels.

=== Campaign of Sindh ===
In 1472, forty thousand Notqul-qawwas tribe rebelled against Mahmud's maternal grandfather Jam Nizamuddin of Sindh. The Notqul-qawwas were independent coastal area tribe who raided Gujarat's borders. Recognizing the threat to trade and regional stability, Mahmud Begada launched a swift punitive expedition across the desert frontier to suppress the rebellion. Mahmud marched with a large army, selecting 1,000 cavalry equipped with spare horses to cross the desert. Informed by the Gujarati army the rebels either fled or hid. When Mahmud arrived, he found their camps empty. His troops killed the remaining hidden, capturing the women and children. He plundered the camp, effectively ending the revolt. Although some officers urged annexation, Mahmud refused out of respect for his family ties with Sindh. He accepted gifts from Jam Nizamuddin and returned to Mustafabad.

=== Conquest of Dwarka ===
In 1473, pirates from Bet Dwarka attacked the ship of Maulana Mahmud Samarqandi. They seized his wife and belongings, leaving him with his two small children. The Maulana travelled to Mahmud Begada's court and appealed for justice. Moved by his story, the Sultan promised to punish the pirates and arranged for the Maulana and his children to stay in Ahmedabad. On 14 May 1473, Sultan Mahmud marched with a large army against Dwarka. Raja Bhim, caught unprepared, abandoned the city and fled to Bet Dwarka. The Gujarati forces entered Dwarka without any opposition. They plundered it demolishing temples and idols and captured large amounts of treasure. Mahmud stayed four months, ordered a mosque built, and gathered ships to attack the island. He then moved to Amroh, opposite Bet Dwarka. After the naval fleet arrived he began the siege of Bet Dwarka. Raja Bhim's flotilla tried to prevent a landing, but after fierce fighting with arrows and muskets the Rajputs were driven back into the fort. The Gujarati forces launched a sudden assault. Raja Bhim fled by boat with a few followers. The remaining defenders were killed and their women and children put to death. Mahmud entered the fort and recovered the Maulana's wife along with other Muslim prisoners. He then ordered to capture of the fugitive raja. The temples and idols of Bet Dwarka were destroyed and a mosque was built. Malik Toghan Farhat-ul-Mulk was placed in charge of both Dwarka and Bet Dwarka. The Hindu kingdom was annexed to the Gujarat Sultanate, establishing Muslim rule in the region for the first time. Through this conquest the Okhamandal peninsula was also formally annexed. On 6 October 1473 Mahmud returned to Mustafabad with the spoils and the Maulana's family. In the meantime, Raja Bhim was also captured and brought in chains, was handed over to the Maulana. At the latter's insistence the raja was dragged through Ahmedabad and hewn to pieces. The remains of the raja were hung on the city gates.

=== Conquest of Champaner ===
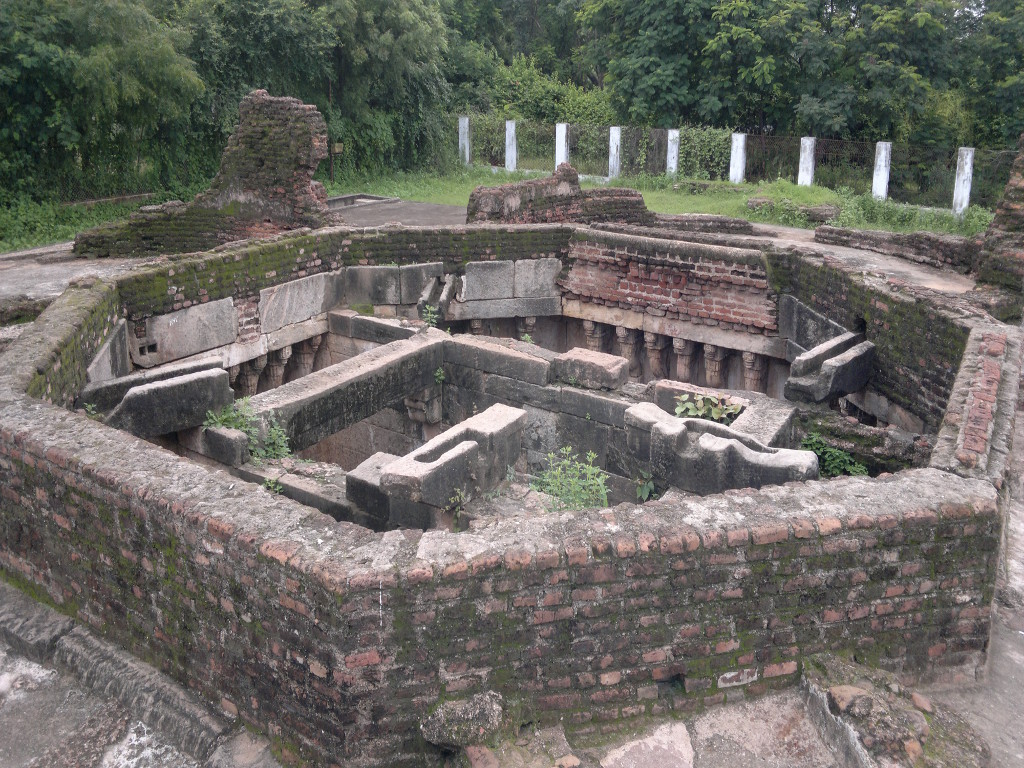
Bhammariyo Kuvo

In 1479, Mahmud Shah sent an army to ravage Champaner then held by Khichi Chauhan Rajputs which titled themselves as Raval. About this time, hearing that the neighbourhood was infested with robbers, he founded the city of Mehmudabad (now Mahemdavad) on the banks of the Vatrak river, about eighteen miles south of Ahmedabad. Several monuments in Mahemdavad are credited to him including Bhammariyo Kuvo, a well; Chanda-Suraj No Mehal, a palace and Roza-Rozi.

In 1482 there was a partial famine in Gujarat, and the Champaner country being exempt from scarcity the commandant of Moramli or Rasulabad, a post in the Gaekwar's Saonli district on the Champaner frontier, made several forays across the border. In return the chief attacked the commandant and defeated him, killing most of his men and capturing two elephants and several horses. On hearing this Mahmud Shah set out for Baroda (now Vadodara) with a powerful army. When Mahmud reached Baroda the Raval of Champaner, Jayasingh, becoming alarmed, sent ambassadors and sued for forgiveness. The king rejected his overtures, saying: "Except the sword and the dagger no message shall pass between me and you." The Raval made preparations for a determined resistance, and sent messengers to summon Ghias-ud-din Khalji of Malwa Sultanate to his aid. To prevent this junction Mahmud Shah entrusted the siege to his nobles and marched to Dahod, on which Sultan Ghias-ud-din withdrew to Mandu. On his return from Dahod, the Sultan began building a Jama Mosque at Champaner to show that he would not leave the place till he had taken the hill-fort of Pavagadh. After the siege had lasted more than twenty months (April 1483–December 1484), the Mahmud's soldiers noticed that for an hour or two in the morning most of the soldiers of Raval were off duty bathing and dressing. A morning assault was planned and the first gate carried. Then Malik Ayaz Sultani finding a practicable breach passed through with some of his men and took the great gate. The Raval and his Rajputs rushed out in a fierce but unavailing charge. The Raval and his minister Dungarshi fell wounded into the conqueror's hands, and, on refusing to embrace Islam, were put to death. Pavagadh was conquered on 21 November 1484. Two daughters of Raval Jayasingh were taken into the sultan's harem. The Raval's son, who was entrusted to Saif-ul-Mulk, and converted to Islam, afterwards, in the reign of Muzaffar Shah (r. 1523–1526), was ennobled by the title of Nizam-ul-Mulk.

On the capture of Pavagadh, Mahmud Shah built a wall round the town of Champaner, and made it his capital under the name of Muhammadabad. Under Mahmud's orders the neighbourhood became stocked with mangoes, pomegranates, figs, grapes, sugarcane, plantains, oranges, custard apples, khirnis or raens (Mimusops indica or hexandra), jackfruit, and cocoa palms, as well as with roses, chrysanthemums, jasmins, champas, and sweet pandanus. A sandal grove near Champaner is said to have had trees large enough to help his nobles to build their mansions. At the instance of the Sultan a Khurasani beautified one of the gardens with fountains and cascades. A Gujarati named Halur learning the principle improved on his master's design in a garden about four miles west of Champaner, which in his honour still bears the name Halol. It took 23 years to build the town. The town was conquered by the Mughal Empire under Humayun in 1535.

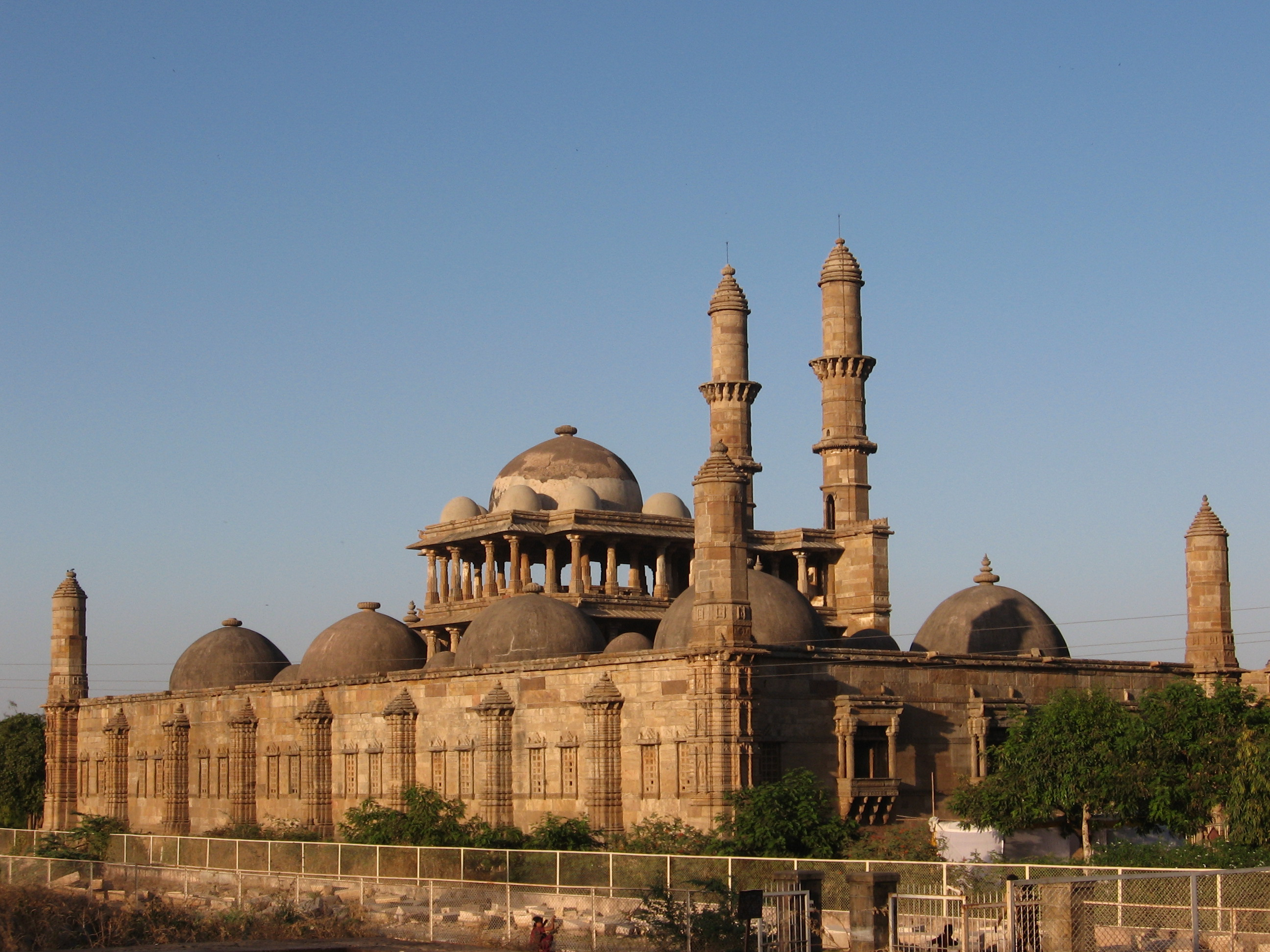
Jama Mosque, Champaner

The magnificent Jama mosque of Champaner is considered as one of the finest architectural edifices in Gujarat. It is an imposing structure on a high plinth with two tall minarets 30 m tall, 172 pillars and seven mihrabs. The central dome, the placement of balconies and carved entrance gates with fine stone jalis. Other Champaner structures attributed to the Begada period are the Kevada Masjid, Citadel Jahanpanah, Shahar ki Masjid, Mandvi the customs house, Nagina Masjid, Bava Man's Masjid, Khajuri Masjid, Ek Minar Masjid, and the Lila Gumbaz. Champaner-Pavagadh Archaeological Park is now UNESCO World Heritage Site.

=== Sack of Kuva ===
In 1486 Vaghoji Jhala of Jhalavad rebelled against the Sultanate. Mirza Khalil Khan, governor of Sorath, marched against him and was defeated near Saidpur on 21 March 1487. Sultan Mahmud Begada led expedition in person and laid siege to Kuva. Vaghoji resolved to defend the fort. When provisions ran short, Vaghoji came out in open to fight the Gujarati army. He ordered that if his banner fell the Ranis were to immolate themselves. During the fighting the standard-bearer, exhausted, set the banner down. Seeing this, the guards began to carry out their orders. On hearing the news, the Ranis threw themselves into a well and were drowned. Vaghoji returned, learned of their fate, and re-entered the fight. He was killed on 19 April 1487 with most of his officers and six of his sons. The Gujarati army sacked Kuva, which ceased to be the Jhala capital. The event, known as Kuva-no-Kehr (“the catastrophe of Kuva”), remains proverbial among the Jhalas for any great loss.

=== Sirohi affairs ===
The Rajput state of Sirohi on Gujarat's northern border maintained friendly relations with the Sultans of Gujarat. Muzaffar Shah I and Ahmad Shah I used to pass through its territory unhindered during their respective campaigns. In 1487, merchants from Iraq and Khorasan brought about 400 horses and fabrics destined for the Gujarat government reportedly ordered by the Sultan. While resting at Abu in Sirohi, their goods were taken forcefully likely by local soldiers or the fortress officer. The merchants appealed to Mahmud calling him Khalifa. Sultan Mahmud sent letters demanding back all the goods. Being frightened, the Raja restored 370 horses, paid for the rest that had died, sought forgiveness, and sent tributes.

=== Battle of Ranpur ===
Ranpur was held by the Gohil chief Ranji II as a feudatory of the Gujarat Sultans. According to bardic account Ras Mala, Mahmud Begada's queen (a daughter of the Raja of Marwar) took offence after her sister, Ranaji's wife, refused to dine with her for fear of losing caste by eating with a woman married to a Muslim. The queen complained the issue to Sultan Mahmud. He tried to lure the chief and his wife come to Ahmedabad but failed. At the same time Ranji executed son of a Muslim woman who recited the Islamic call to prayer in Ranpur. The boy's mother appealed to the Sultan. Mahmud marched on Ranpur, sending his nephew Bhandari Khan to lead the army. Ranji checked them near Dhandhuka. He was driven back to the fort. The Gohil told his wives to kill themselves if his royal banner fell. In battle the standard-bearer briefly set the emblem down to drink, the Ranis mistook the signal and jumped into a well committing suicide. Ranji and Bhandari Khan were both killed, and the fort fell to the victorious Gujarati forces. Ranpur was annexed into Gujarat Sultanate. Afterwards, Ranaji's nephew Haluji Parmar converted to Islam and received Ranpur. He is the founder of the Ranpur Molesalams. A younger brother of the slain chief also converted, obtained villages around Botad, and established a branch of the Dholka Kasbatis.

=== Bahadur Khan Gilani's incursion ===
Bahadur Khan Gilani, son of the Bahmani governor of Goa and rebelled after Mahmud Gawan's murder. He seized Dabhol and the Konkan, declaring independence. From 1491 he conducted piracy extending raids along the Gujarat coast. His officer Yaqut attacked and sacked Mahim with 12 ships and captured Gujarati vessels. In 1494 Mahmud ordered a joint campaign. A fleet of 300 ships under Admiral Safdar-ul-Mulk and a land army under Kiwam-ul-Mulk were dispatched. A gale wrecked the fleet off Mahim; most sailors were killed or captured, the admiral taken, and the ships seized. The land force halted at Agashi and Bassein upon learning of the disaster. Kiwam-ul-Mulk sent letters to Sultan Mahmud. Mahmud first sent letters demanding surrender which Gilani refused insultingly. He then asked the Bahmani ruler Mahmood Shah Bahmani II to take action against the incursion. Bahmani forces under Qasim Barid I defeated and killed Gilani near Kolhapur. His head was sent to the Bahmani court. All his possessions were seized and the captured ships and cargoes returned. Safdar-ul-Mulk was freed and sailed home with gifts from the Bahmani ruler as a gesture of goodwill.

=== Campaign of Khandesh and Daulatabad ===
The Farooqui dynasty of Khandesh acknowledged Gujarat's suzerainty and paid regular tribute. However, Adil Khan II (r. 1457–1501) of Khandesh proud of his conquests refused vassal status to Gujarat. He allied with Ahmadnagar and Berar, and stopped paying tribute to Mahmud Begada. In 1498, Sultan Mahmud marched on Khandesh. He intentioned to capture Daulatabad. Just as Mahmud was advancing on Khandesh, Malik Ashraf the governor of Daulatabad asked Mahmud Begada for help against Ahmad Nizam Shah's expansion. Adil Khan II, Ahmad Nizam Shah, and Fathullah Imad-ul-Mulk united against him, the Deccan allies withdrew. The Gujarati army advanced swiftly before they could reinforce Khandesh. Adil Khan II submitted, paid tribute, and Mahmud reasserted Gujarat’s suzerainty in 1500.

=== War with the Portuguese ===
Cambay (now Khambhat) was an important port of the Gujarat Sultanate. It was an essential intermediary in east–west trade, between the Red Sea, Egypt and Malacca. Gujaratis were important middlemen bringing spices from the Maluku Islands as well as silk from China, and then selling them to the Mamluks and Arabs. The Portuguese had entered India and were strengthening their presence in Arabian Sea. Mahmud Begada allied with the Kozhikkodu Samutiri (anglicised to Zamorin of Calicut) to defeat the Portuguese. He then asked his trade partners, the Egyptian Mamluk Sultanate of Cairo, for help. In 1508, near Daman, on his way to Chaul, Mahmud heard of the victory gained in the Battle of Chaul over the Portuguese by the Gujarat squadron under Malik Ayyaz Sultani, in concert with the Egyptian fleet of the Mamluks. In 1509, the Battle of Diu, a naval battle was fought near Diu port between the Portuguese Empire and a joint fleet of the Gujarat Sultanate under Malik Ayyaz, the Mamluk Burji Sultanate of Egypt, the Zamorin of Calicut with support of the Turkish feet of Ottoman Empire, the Republic of Venice and the Republic of Ragusa (Dubrovnik). The Portuguese won the battle, and the event marks the start of European colonialism in Asia.

== Foreign relations ==
=== Delhi Sultanate ===
Since the foundation of Gujarat Sultanate neither the Delhi sultans tried to re-establish its control over Gujarat, nor did the Sultan of Gujarat maintain any connection with Delhi. Sikandar Lodi's reign records the only instance diplomatic exchange. In June 1508, an embassy from Sikandar Lodi arrived at Muhammadabad–Champaner with a pair of rhinoceroses, thirty horses, and other precious commodities for Sultan Mahmud Begada as gift. In return, Mahmud bestowed a rich khilat upon the ambassador and sent parrots, herons, and Arabian horses as presents for Sikandar Lodi. According to Nizamuddin and Firishta, these exchanges were made as tokens of friendship. the Delhi sultan sent valuable gifts to Sultan Mahmud, but no formal diplomatic relations were established.

=== Malwa Sultanate ===
Relations between Gujarat and Malwa had always been hostile. After Mahmud Begada accessed the throne, Mahmud Khalji of Malwa halted aggression. In 1500, Mahmud Begada planned to invade Malwa after Nasir-ud-Din poisoned his father Ghiyath Shah. Nasiruddin sought peaceful coexistence. Mahmud decided to maintain friendly terms with Malwa.

=== Safavid Empire ===
In 1510, Shah Ismail Safavi of Persia recognizing his importance in international politics, sought to maintain good relations with Gujarat. He had sent him a friendly embassy headed by Yadgar Beg Qizilbash. As the Qizilbashes was Shia, the Sultan, who was a staunch Sunni, prayed that he might not be forced to see a Shia's face during his last days. His prayer was heard. He died before the Persian embassy entered the city.

== Death and succession ==
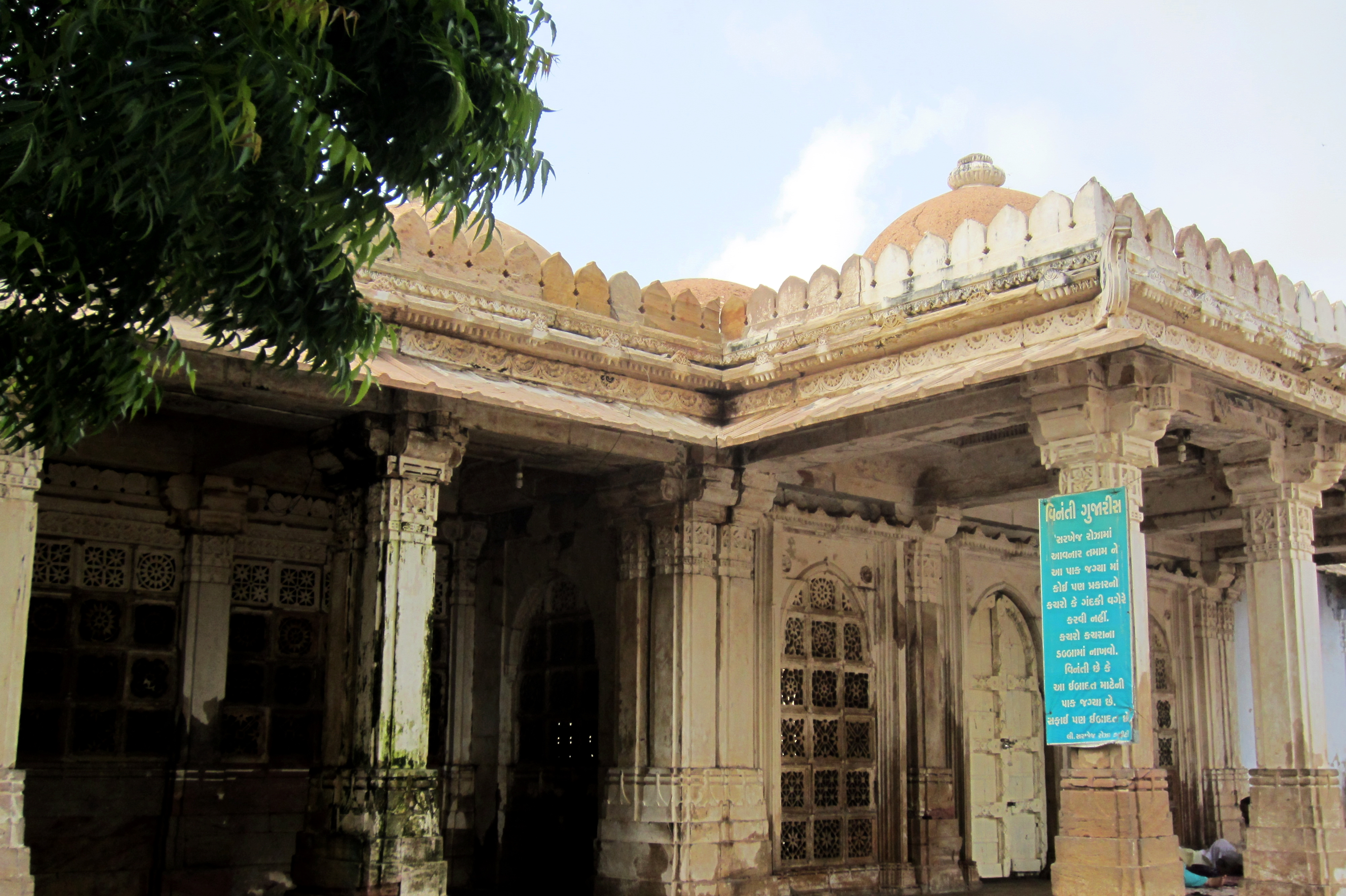
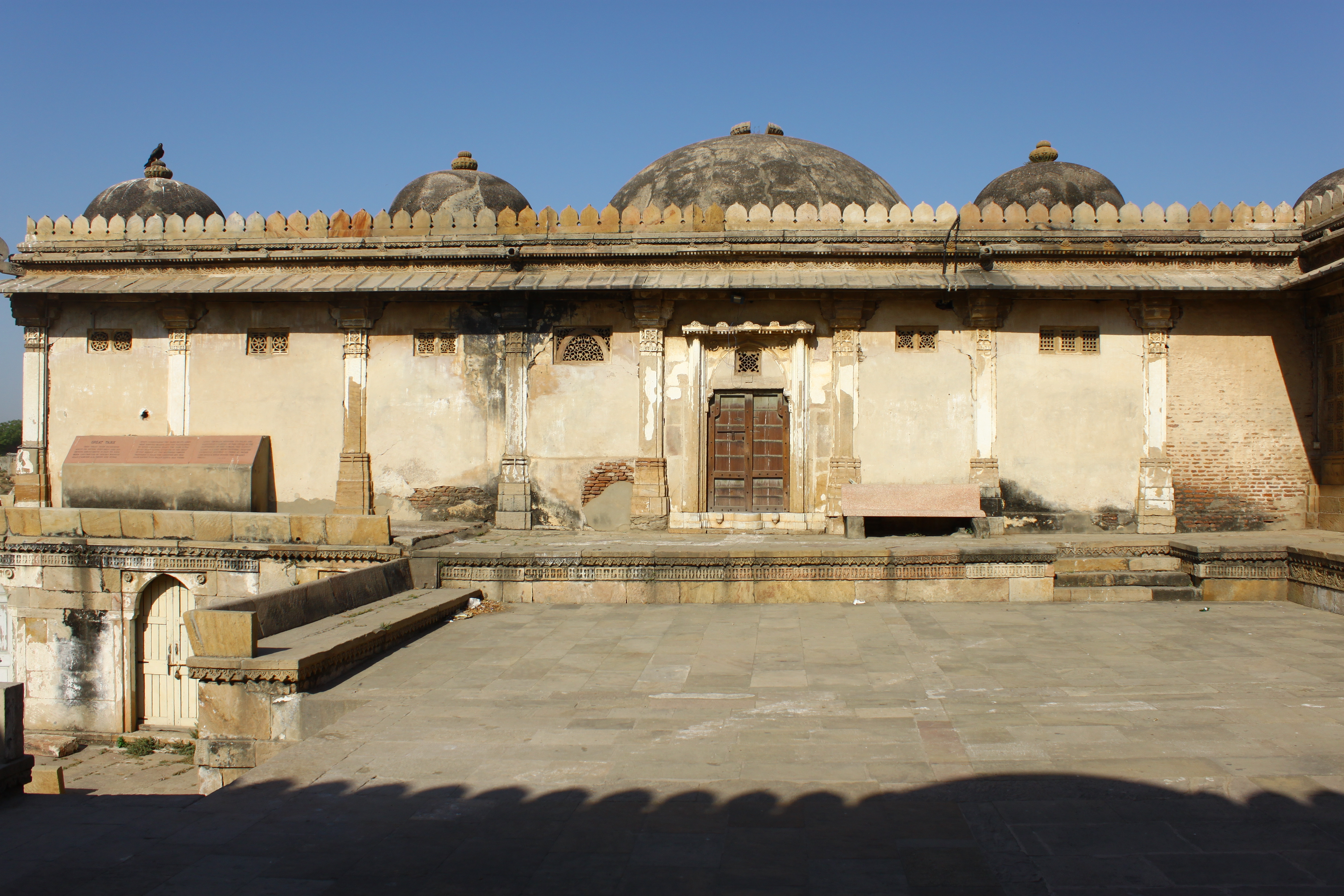
Mausoleum of Mahmud Begada (left) and his queen Bibi Rajbai (right) at Sarkhej Roza, Ahmedabad

During the last days of Sultan Mahmud, Sayed Muhammad of Jaunpur, who claimed to be the Mahdi or Messiah, came from Jaunpur and lodged in Tajkhan Salar's mosque near the Jamalpur gate of Ahmedabad. His sermons drew crowds, and were so persuasive that he gained a large body of followers, who believed his eloquence to be due to hal or inspiration. Mahmud's ministers persuaded him not to see the Jaunpur preacher.

Sultan Mahmud's health deteriorated aftermath of the Deccan campaign. In March 1511, he visited the holy saints of Patan to offer his final homage to them. After four days he returned to Ahmedabad and paid a visit to the tomb of Shaikh Ahmad Khattu at Sarkhej. A tomb had been prepared for him at the foot of the Shaikh's mausoleum. Tears rolled down his cheeks when he saw it. Sometime later, Mahmud Shah suddenly fell ill. He ceased to attend the court. Unable to look after the administration personally, he summoned Prince Khalil Khan from Baroda. The gave advice to his son and then called his courtiers and nobles. He declared Prince Khalil Khan his heir-apparent ordering them to obey him. After three months his conditions improved. He therefore sent the crown prince back to Baroda. Within a few days his condition took a turn for the worse. Physicians were summoned from every corner of the kingdom, but their best efforts proved of no avail. The dying Sultan again ordered Prince Khalil to come immediately from Baroda. Before the prince could arrive, Mahmud Begada died on Monday, 2 Ramzan 917 AH corresponding to 23 November 1511 at the age of sixty-six years and three months, after a reign of fifty-four years and one month. Khalil Khan reached just in time to assist in bearing his father's coffin from Ahmadabad to Sarkhej. Mahmud was buried at Sarkhej Roza near Ahmedabad and received the after-death title of Khudaigan-i-Halim or the Meek Lord.

Upon the death of Sultan Mahmud, the nobles were divided over the succession. While some favoured the accession of his grandson, Bahadur Khan, arguing that Khalil Khan's religious disposition made him unsuitable for the throne, others maintained that since Sultan Mahmud had personally designated Khalil Khan as his successor during his lifetime and that his decision should therefore be respected. The latter position ultimately prevailed, and Khalil Khan ascended the throne as Muzaffar Shah II.

== Administration ==
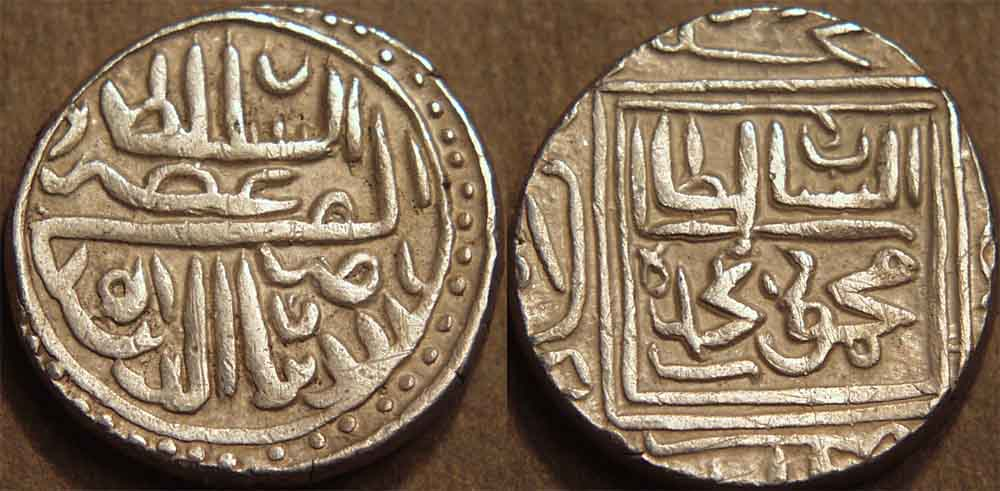
Silver tanka coins of Mahmud Begada

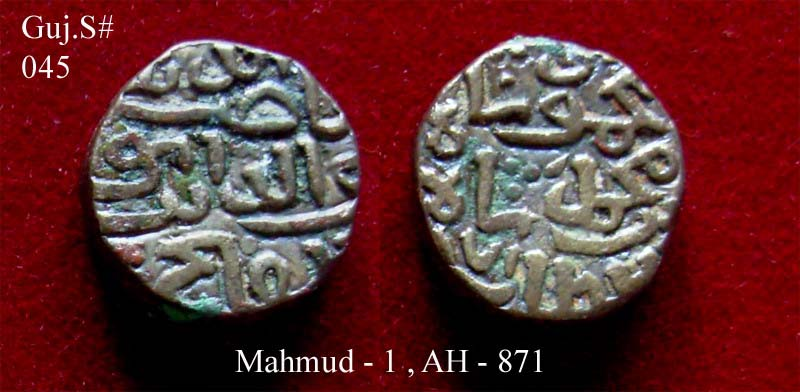
Copper coins of Mahmud Begada

His firm policy of never ousting the landholder except for proved oppression or exaction was productive of such prosperity that the revenue increased two, three and in some cases tenfold. The roads were safe from freebooters and trade was secure. A rule forbidding soldiers to borrow money at interest is favourably noticed. A special officer was appointed to make advances to needy soldiers with the power to recover from their pay in fixed instalments. Mahmud also devoted much attention to the culture of fruit trees. Hospitals were opened and medicines freely given to the sick. The poor received clothes and free medicines alike.

=== Military ===
He doubled the strength of the army. He continued to give the land grants of the fief-holders to their sons. Half of the grant went to their daughters if there were no male heir in the family. In Mahmud's reign an instance is mentioned of the form of compensation. Some merchants bringing horses and other goods for sale from Iraq and Khurasan were plundered in Sirohi limits. The king caused them to give in writing the price of their horses and stuffs and paying them from his own treasury recovered the amount from the Raja of Sirohi.

He led expeditions against the Rajput states and conquered them one after another. The conquest and annexation of Junagarh, Dwarka, and Champaner extended the frontiers of the kingdom. He adopted non-aggressive policies against any Muslim state. Being a devout Muslim he carried out religious war against the Hindu subjects.

=== Art and culture ===
Mahmud Begada patronized of art and literature. He valued the works of contemporary scholars. He built many colleges and mosques for education. The architecture during his period is known as the Begarh style of architecture. Observing Islamic laws statues and sculptures were never patronized. No fragment of Muslim architecture in Gujarat during his period lasted till this day.

Mahmud Begada was the subject of Persian and Sanskrit texts. Udayaraja wrote the Rājavinoda (Pleasure of the King) about Mahmud Begada, presenting the king as "an Indic king" with kshatriya heritage.

=== Nobles ===
Mahmud Begada's court was adorned by several pious and high-minded nobles. In life they vied with one another in generous acts; and after death, according to the Persian poet Urfi, they left their traces in the characters and carvings of stone walls and marble piles. First among these nobles the Mirat-i-Sikandari mentions Dawar-ul-Mulk, whose god-fearing administration made his estates so prosperous that they were coveted by princes of the blood. As Thanadar of Amron in north Kathiawad, he spread Islam from Morbi to Bhuj, and after his death his fame as a spirit-ruling guardian drew hosts of sick and possessed to his shrine near Morbi. The second was Malik Ayaz, governor of Diu, who built the strong fortress afterwards reconstructed by the Portuguese. He also built a tower on an under-water rock, and from the tower drew a massive iron chain across the mouth of the harbour. A substantial bridge over the creek, that runs through the island of Diu, was afterwards destroyed by the Portuguese. The third was Khudawand Khan Alim, the founder of Alimpura a suburb to the south of Ahmedabad, adorned with a mosque of sandstone and marble. He introduced the cultivation of melons figs and sugarcane into Gujarat from Bijapur. The fourth was Imad-ul-Mulk Asas who founded Isanpur, a suburb between Shah Alam's suburb of Islampur and Vatva (all now in Ahmedabad) and planted along the road groves of khirnis and mangoes. The fifth was Tajkhan Salar, so loved of his peers that after his death none of them would accept his title. The sixth was Malik Sarang Kiwam-ul-Mulk, a Rajput by birth, the founder of the suburb of Sarangpur and its mosque to the east of Ahmedabad. The seventh and eighth were the Khurasani brothers Aazam and Moazzam, who built a cistern, a mosque, and a their tomb between Vasna and Sarkhej.

=== Urbanization ===
He also founded the cities of Mustafabad (Junagadh) and Muhammadabad (Champaner). Skilled and learned men were invited to settlement there. Besides many mosques and gardens were constructed. Caravanserais were built for of travellers. For their convenience, horses were kept ready in each sarai. He planted flower and fruit trees in beautiful gardens. Even beggars were richly rewarded for their work in planting them.

== Family ==
Mahmud Begada is known to have four sons, and at least one daughter:

- Muhammad Kala, whose mother was Rani Rupamanjari. Both the Prince and his mother died before the Sultan, and the Rani's tomb is in the Rani no Haziro the Manek Chowk at Ahmedabad.
- Abu Bakr Khan, or Aba Khan/Apa Khan, the son of Rani Sipari or Sarani. He was caught trespassing in a noble's harem and was ordered by the Sultan to be poisoned. Rani Sipari's Rauza is situated near the Astodiya gate at Ahmedabad.
- Ahmad Khan Khudawand Khan attempted to place Ahmad on the throne in 1480. His complicity in the plot appears to have cost the Prince the throne, since he was eventually passed over for the succession.
- Khalil Khan born in 1475 was the youngest of all. His mother Rani Hirabai was the daughter of Naga Rana, a Rajput chief on the banks of the river Mahi. She died four days after the birth of the prince. Hansabai, Sultan Mahmud's step-mother took care of him. He succeeded his father as Muzaffar Shah II.
- A daughter, married Hasan Khan, a prince of Khandesh. Their son, Alam Khan, ascended the throne of Khandesh as Adil Khan III, married a daughter of Muzaffar Shah II, and their son, Miran Muhammad I, ascended the throne of Gujarat in 1537.

According to local tradition, Begada allegedly also had a daughter named Gindoli, who was abducted and later married by Rawal Jagmal (son of Rawal Mallinath). Their descendants are referred to as Mahecha Rathores, the oldest among all houses of Rathore clan.

== Legacy ==
His religious ardour, his love of justice, his bravery, and his wise measures entitle Mahmud to the highest place among the Gujarat kings. His reign is characterized as golden age in the history of Gujarat Sultanate. He is considered as the greatest and most renowned Sultan of Gujarat. Udayaraja, the author of the Mahmuda-Suratrana-Charita, wrote poems comparing Mahmud equal to Hindu gods:

in battle Mahmud is equal to Bhima;
in benevolence he surpasses Karna;
in sport he is like Narayana;
in mercy he resembles Rama;
in wisdom he is greater than Brihaspati;
in beauty he excels Manmatha.

== In culture ==
He was built tall and robust, with a beard that descended to his girdle and heavy moustaches that twisted and curled upwards. Some European travellers circulated popular tales about him. One of these tales said that he was given mild poisons from his childhood which had made him poisonous and immune to poisons and those became the source for the English satirist Samuel Butler's seventeenth-century lines: "The Prince of Cambay's daily food is asp and basilisk and toad". It is said that Mahmud's father had fed him on poison from his childhood. He had been addicted to opium-eating since infancy, and the opium had a poisonous effect. It is said that his women numbered between three and four thousand, and that the woman with whom he spent the night was always found dead. The only woman who could bear his embraces unharmed was an Abyssinian girl who was his great favourite. There are various other stories about his good appetite. According to Sikandar, his daily food weighted fifteen Bahluli seers. In addition, five seers of boiled rice were placed in two plates on each side of his couch so that he might take it during the night without the least trouble. According to Portuguese traveller Duarte Barbosa, Mahmud used to eat lot of food during the day and meat patties (Samosas) were kept at his bedside by his servants at night in case he felt hungry. At breakfast he used to take a cup of honey and one hundred and fifty bananas. These accounts are very exaggerated.
