= Bahadur Khan Gilani =

Bahmani nobleman

Bahadur Khan Gilani (died c. 1494) was a Bahmani nobleman and rebel who seized control of the Konkan and conducted extensive piracy along the Gujarat coast from 1491 to 1494.

He rose in revolt at Dabhol after Mahmud Gawan's murder and soon dominated the Konkan. From there his fleets preyed on Gujarat shipping, capturing vessels belonging to Sultan Mahmud Begada and sacking the port of Mahim. Gujarat's subsequent land-and-sea expedition against him failed, prompting Mahmud Begada to demand action from the Bahmani court. The Bahmani minister Qasim Barid then led a campaign that defeated and killed Gilani near Kolhapur; his head was sent to the Bahmani capital and the captured Gujarat ships were restored.

== Biography ==
Bahadur Gilani was the son of the Bahmani governor of Goa. He was a native of Gilan like his master Mahmud Gawan, therefore became a protégé of the minister. After the murder of Mahmud Gawan, he rebelled at the port of Dabhol and soon took control of the entire Konkan. During 1491–1494 he carried out piracy in the sea. He declared independence and proclaimed sovereignty. From there he extended his piracies northward along the Gujarat coast. One of his officers, an Abyssinian named Yaqut, attacked Mahim with a fleet of twelve ships and sacked and burnt the place. He captured some Gujarati vessels. Sultan Mahmud Begada of Gujarat resolved to take strong action against these insults to his authority. He ordered a joint expedition. A large fleet of some three hundred vessels under Admiral Safdar-ul-Mulk was to sail down the coast, while a land army under Kiwam-ul-Mulk Malik Sarang advanced toward Dabhol and the Konkan. The naval force met disaster. Off the coast of Mahim a severe gale drove the ships ashore. Most of the sailors were washed up, only to be massacred or taken prisoner by Gilani's men. The admiral himself was captured and the vessels seized. When Kiwam-ul-Mulk reached the Gujarat border at Agashi (19.4609°N 72.7757°E) and Bassein, he learned of the disaster. Unwilling to march farther into Bahmani territory without orders, he halted and sent word to Ahmedabad. Mahmud Begada was in no wish to invade the Bahmani kingdom. He first demanded that Bahadur Gilani restore the captured ships and cargoes. The latter answered in an insulting manner. The Sultan then sent an envoy to the Bahmani court, asking Mahmood Shah Bahmani II to suppress the rebel himself. The Bahmani ruler and his minister, Qasim Barid, gathered troops and marched against Gilani. After prolonged fighting the rebel was defeated and killed near Kolhapur. His head was sent to the Bahmani court and his possessions seized. The captured Gujarat ships and their cargoes were restored to Admiral Safdar-ul-Mulk, who was released from prison. The admiral then sailed north carrying valuable gifts from the Bahmani ruler to Sultan Mahmud as a token of gratitude and goodwill.

== Bibliography ==
- Commissariat, M. S. (1938). A History of Gujarat, including a survey of its chief architectural monuments and inscriptions. Bombay: Longmans, Green & Co.
- Chaube, J. (1975). History of Gujarat Kingdom, 1458-1537. Munshiram Manoharlal Publishers. ISBN 978-0-88386-573-6.
