= Jayasimha II (Chudasama dynasty) =

- Ra of Saurashtra
- Reign: 1416–1430 CE
- Predecessor: Meliga
- Successor: Mahipala III
Era name and dates
- Vikram Samvat: 1472–1486
- Dynasty: Chudasama dynasty
- Father: Meliga
- Religion: Hinduism

Ra Jayasimha II (Note: Older chronology mentions him as Jayasimha III.) was a Chudasama king of Saurashtra region of western India who reigned from 1416 CE to 1430 CE (VS 1472 to VS 1486). His capital was at Junagadh.

== Reign ==
Jayasimha II succeeded his father Meliga in 1416 CE. During his reign, Gujarat Sultan Ahmad Shah I was too much occupied by Gujarat and Malwa affairs to again visit Sorath. The inscription (VS 1473 / 1417 CE) in the wall of Mahaprabhu Bethak on the east of the Revati Kund near Damodar Kund, Junagadh says that he defeated the Yavana (i.e. Muslims) in the battle at the fort of Jhanjharkot. (Note: Jhanjharkot is identified with modern day Jhanjhmer in Bhavnagar district, Gujarat by Diskalkar but Parikh considers one of the following villages near Junagadh more likely: Jhanjharia near Una, Jhanhjarda near Junagadh, Jhinjhari near Manavadar, Jhanjharpur near Maliya Hatina, Jhinjhuda near Mendarda.) The commander of his army was Damodar, son of Narasimha. He order a Matha to be built for pilgrims which is now Mahaprabhu Bethak. Another inscription (VS 1485 / 1429 CE) mentioning his name is located at Naganatha temple, Chorwad. His reign seems peaceful. He was succeeded in 1430 CE by his brother Mahipala III.
