= Mahipala III =

Ra of Saurashtra from 1430 to 1451

- Ra of Saurashtra
- Reign: 1430–1451 CE
- Predecessor: Jayasimha II
- Successor: Mandalika III
- Issue: Mandalika III
Era name and dates
- Vikram Samvat: 1486–1507
- Dynasty: Chudasama dynasty
- Father: Meliga
- Religion: Hinduism

Ra Mahipala III (Note: Older chronology mentions him as Mahipala VI.) was a Chudasama king of Saurashtra region of western India who reigned from 1430 CE to 1451 CE (VS 1486 to VS 1507). His capital was at Junagadh.

== Reign ==
Mahipala III succeeded his brother Jayasimha II in 1430 CE. He was most devoted to religion and entertained all the Dwarka and Somnath pilgrims at his own charges. He was also a devoted worshipper of Damodar Rai (a name of Krishna) and practised much asceticism in order to procure a son. A son was born to him eventually and named Mandalika. There is no battle to have happen in his reign as Gujarat Sultan Ahmad Shah I had died in 1442 and there was an uncertain condition in the Sultanate. Mandalika-Mahakavya mentions that he had defeated Sangan, a king of the west (of Bet Dwarka). He abdicated throne in favour of his son Mandalika III in 1451 CE (VS 1507) and went to forest.

Two paliya inscriptions dated VS 1488 (1432 CE) and VS 1495 (1439 CE) erected during his reign inscribing his name with titles Maharaja and Ranashri are located at Mesavana village. They were erected for a conflict regarding some cows. He is also mentioned in genealogy of Revati Kund near Damodar Kund, Junagadh (VS 1472/1417 CE) and Neminath Temple inscription (c. VS 1510/c. 1454 CE) on Girnar.
