= Conquest of Junagadh =

Gujarat Sultanate's conquest of Junagadh (1467–1470)

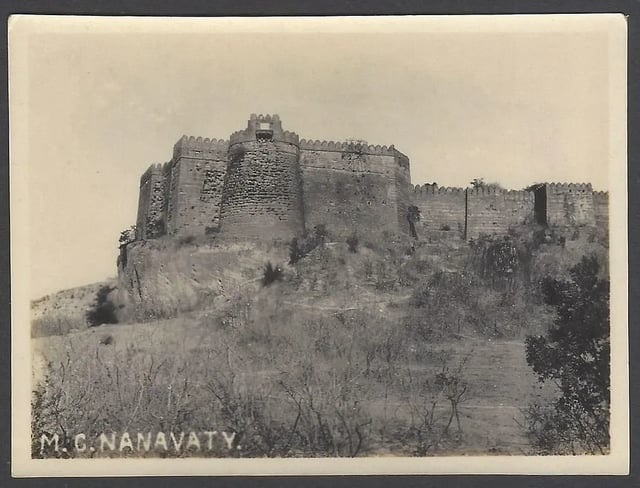
- Uparkot fort of Junagadh
Date	1467 – 4 December 1470
Location	Junagadh, Gujarat 21°31′22.37″N 70°27′34.48″E
Result	Gujarat Sultanate victory: Fall of the Chudasama dynasty
Territorial changes	Junagadh annexed to Gujarat Sultanate

Belligerents
Gujarat Sultanate	Chudasama dynasty

Commanders and leaders
Mahmud Begada; Tughlaq Khan; Alam Khan Faruqi †	Mandalika III (WIA) (surrendered)

Strength
40,000	36,000

Casualties and losses
Heavy	Heavy
- Location within Gujarat Siege of Junagadh (India)

The Conquest of Junagadh was a series of military campaigns led by Sultan Mahmud Begada of the Gujarat Sultanate against Rao Mandalika III of the Chudasama dynasty of Junagadh in Kathiawar (Sorath) between 1467 and 1470 in present-day Gujarat, India. The war against lasted for nearly four years and involved at least three campaigns leading the annexation of Junagadh.

Mahmud Begada sought the conquest of Junagadh to eliminate the most powerful independent Rajput principality in Kathiawar and bring the entire peninsula under direct control. The Chudasama rulers had long paid only irregular tribute, sheltered rebels, and were bitter enemies of Gujarat Sultanate. Mahmud also viewed it as a religious duty to spread Islam. In the first campaign in 1467, Mahmud besieged Mahabala before accepting temporary submission and tribute. In the second campaign in 1468 he despatched a large force to demand the surrender of Mandalika's royal insignia. The Rao complied to avoid further conflict. The decisive campaign began in late 1469. After rejecting offers of tribute and insisting on the Rao's conversion to Islam, Mahmud besieged first the Uparkot fortress at Junagadh and then the hillfort of Girnar. Despite heavy Rajput resistance Mandalika was compelled to surrender Girnar on 4 December 1470 and accept Islam, ending Chudasama independence. The annexation brought the entire state of Junagadh under direct Gujarat Sultanate control extending the sultanate's frontiers to the sea. Junagadh was renamed Mustafabad. The conquest paved further expansion in Kathiawar peninsula.

== Background ==
The Rajput Chudasama dynasty of Junagadh was the most powerful among the independent principalities in Kathiawar. It remained independent throughout the Delhi Sultanate. Muhammad bin Tughlaq had made unsuccessful attempt to conquer it.

After declaring independence from Delhi, the early sultans of Gujarat controlled only a small territory of land between the hills and the sea. Most surrounding regions remained under powerful local Rajput chiefs like those of Junagadh, Champaner, Jhalavad, Idar, Bagar, Dungarpur, Siddhpur and Nandod who paid tribute but retained significant independence rather than actual submission. To protect and consolidate the Gujarat Sultanate, reducing these independent chiefs to full submission was essential. Driven by fear and suspicion of a powerful expanding Muslim state, the local Rajput chiefs resisted until Mahmud Begada finally defeated them and annexed their principalities directly into the Sultanate. The Rao of Junagadh rarely paid tribute and occasionally allied with other rebels to overthrow the Gujarat Sultanate. The Chudasama rulers of Junagadh had always been hostile to the Muslim governors of Gujarat. Establishing the Sultanate's authority in Kathiawar was impossible while Junagadh remained independent. Annexing it was vital for securing the southwestern border and bringing the entire peninsula under imperial control.

In 1395, Muzaffar Shah I led expedition into Junagadh against Rao Durga and exacted gold and jewels on tribute and sue peace. Rao Malingdeva had given refugee to Krishna also known as Satarsalji Jhala, the rebel chief of Jhalavad and the insurgent Malik Sher. Sultan Ahmad Shah I (r. 1411–1442) launched a campaign against the region in 1414 AD. Rao Malingdeva fought the Sultan in a pitched battle but was defeated near Vanthali. Ahmad Shah perused him and besieged Junagadh. He captured the town's lower citadel of the Uparkot fortress. The Rao took refuge in the upper hill-fortress of Girnar but ultimately agree to pay tribute. Ahmad Shah left Sayyid Abul Khair and Sayyid Qasim Khan to collect tribute and appointed his son as the governor of Kathiawar. Mangrol inscription records the princes defeat against the Rao of Junagadh. Following Ahmad Shah I, no further attempts were made to conquer Junagadh during the reigns of Muhammad Shah (r. 1442–1451) or Ahmad Shah II (r. 1451–1459) until the reign of Mahmud Begada.

== Prelude ==
Buoyed by the success of the siege of Barur, Sultan Mahmud Begada continued the expansionist policy. He first targeted the premier state of Junagadh. Since Ahmad Shah's invasion Junagadh had recovered its power. Mahmud Begada took time to reorganize and consolidate his resources before any expedition to be taken against Junagadh. This gave Mandalika III an opportunity to build up his own strength as well. Within a few years of taking power, nearly all the neighbouring rulers submitted to him and paid tribute except for Sangam Vadhel, the chief of Okha. Mandalika marched out to punish him. He defeated Vadhel in their first battle and took him prisoner, later releasing him only after he agreed to pay a heavy tribute. This firmly established Mandalika's position as the undisputed leader of the Rajput states in Kathiawar.

Mahmud Begada maintained friendly relation with Rao Mandalika for six years. He made plans for its conquest in 1460 AD. Rao Mandalika failed to see through Sultan Mahmud's motives. The Sultan strategically asked him to punish Dudo Gohil of Arthila (in present day Amreli district) who had been ravaging Gujarat Sultanate's border districts. Dudo Gohil was an ally of Rao Mandalika, had previously given his niece Kunta in marriage to the Rao. Eager to oblige the Sultan, Mandalika attacked Gohil's lands. Dudo Gohil surrendered and offered his daughter Jayalakshmi in marriage but Mandalika loyal to the Sultan refused peace killed him and sacked Arthila. While this victory removed a threat for Sultan Mahmud, it proved disastrous for Mandalika. By killing Gohil, he alienated the Gohil Rajputs and turned key local allies into bitter enemies. Coupled with his earlier conflict with Sangam Vadhel of Okha, Mandalika unknowingly isolated himself just as Mahmud finished preparing his campaign against Junagadh. The Sultan's strategy of division and diplomacy succeeded completely, leaving Mandalika without any foreign support.

By 1467, Sultan Mahmud Begada had consolidated his power and resolved to invade Junagadh. According to Tarikh-i-Sorath, Rao Mandalika fell deeply in love with his prime minister Vishal's beautiful wife, Manmohani. Mandalika forcibly taken to himself Mohini. Outraged by this betrayal and seeking vengeance, Vishal turned against his king. He secretly reached out to Sultan Mahmud Begada, offering his full assistance if the Sultan chose to invade Junagadh. Firishta writes that the previous rulers of Delhi and Gujarat had all failed to capture Junagadh's impregnable fortresses. For Sultan Mahmud Begada, conquering the state was a way to achieve historic military glory by succeeding where earlier monarchs had failed. He further viewed the invasion of Junagadh as a holy duty to spread Islam.

== First campaign ==
Sultan Mahmud knew invading Junagadh would be difficult because Rao Mandalika commanded a powerful army of 36,000 soldiers. To prepare, Mahmud made massive military arrangements: he allocated five crore gold coins from the treasury, gathered thousands of top-quality foreign and local swords including 1,700 Egyptian, Yamani, and Khurasani blades, along with 3,300 Ahmadabadi swords. He also collected 1,700 daggers and secured 2,000 elite Arab and Turkish horses.

In 1467, Mahmud Begada proceeded to capture Junagadh. The Rajputs selected Mahabala, a well-protected defile, as a place of refuge in case their fort was captured. They moved their wives and children with all necessary provisions, in Mahabala while shutting themselves in the fort to carry defensive war. The Rajputs made all these arrangements secretly, but somehow Prince Tughlaq Khan, the maternal uncle of the Sultan, received information of the plan and immediately informed Sultan Mahmud. the Sultan dispatched Tughlaq Khan with 1,700 cavalry to capture Mahabala. The prince lost his way ending up near the hill fort of Girnar instead. When no updates arrived from the prince, the Sultan grew concerned and set out with a small escort to find him. He publicized the move to be a hunting trip. The Rajputs, confident in the safety of Mahabala, ignored the movements and took no actions. Mahmud exploiting the situation launched a sudden attack. The imperial troops learning of the assault hurried to join the advance force. Because the path through the dense forest was rough, they left their horses outside the defile and advanced on foot. In a brief fight the Rajputs were beaten and driven back into Girnar fort. Their women and children and large quantities of stores were captured. Since Mandalika had left no army to defend it Mahabala itself was occupied without further fighting. Instead of besieging the hill fortress, Mahmud proceeded to a famous Hindu temple in Mahabala expecting to obtain hidden treasure in the shrine. The Brahmins took arms to fight but were killed. The temple was destroyed and the sacred idol broken.

At the same time, Tughlaq Khan arrived and began to siege the hill fortress. The Rajputs who had escaped from Mahabala told Mandalika of the capture of their women and children and the desecration of the temples. The Rajputs attacked the Tughlaq Khan almost driving him back. The timely arrival of the Sultan with a large army pushed the Rajputs back. Rao Mandalika was severely wounded early in the engagement and was carried back into the fortress. Once he had withdrawn, the remaining Rajputs also retired and shut the gates. The next day Sultan Mahmud pitched his camp close under the walls. Within four days he distributed among his troops five crores of gold coins together with all the captured horses, swords, daggers and poniards. He then dispatched raiding parties both to gather supplies for the camp and to ravage the surrounding countryside. Rao Mandalika realizing he may not be able to defend against the Sultan offered submission and tribute. Mahmud Begada also understood the conquest was not soon to be completed. He therefore accepted the terms. Raising the siege, he returned to his capital for next year.

== Second campaign ==
In 1468, Sultan Mahmud was informed that the Rao Mandalika continued to visit the temple in embroidered robes, with a golden umbrella held over his head and began using royal insignia. He used this matter to take aggressive stance against Junagadh. Mahmud therefore despatched a force of 40,000 cavalry and a large number of elephants. The commander received clear orders to demand the surrender of every emblem of royalty. If the Rao refuse, the country was to be laid waste. The Sultan expected that these humiliating terms would be rejected, thereby giving him casus belli to march in person. The Rao hearing the insulting demands did not reject them as only a year earlier he faced devastating war. To avoid conflicts he surrendered the golden umbrella together with the other royal symbols and presented valuable gifts to the Sultan's officers. The Gujarati commander returned to the capital and laid the surrendered articles before Mahmud. The richly embroidered garments and other items were distributed among the musicians and dancers.

== Third campaign ==
In 1469, Mahmud Begada tried to provoke Rao Mandalika by sending an army to ravage Junagadh. The Rao avoided hostilities by not retaliating. Vishal advised the Rao to replace old stores with scant fresh provisions, then informed the Sultan that the fortress was poorly supplied and invited an attack. In late 1469 Mahmud personally led an army against Girnar. Rao Mandalik met the Sultan in his camp and offered to pay any amount of tribute if the Sultan would withdraw his army. Mahmud replied that he had come neither for tribute nor for plunder, but to establish the true faith of Islam in Kathiawar. The Rao asserted he had been loyal vassal and never committed any offence. The Sultan replied that there was no offence greater than 'infidelity'. Mahmud intent on converting the Rao promising to restore the dominion, even adding some districts, but only after the Rao had accepted Islam. Unable to give either a positive or a negative answer without consulting others, he was allowed by the Sultan to return to the fort for discussion. Without answering his decision to the Sultan, he resolved to reject the proposal and slipped back into the fort of Junagadh under cover of night. During his absence in the Sultan's camp the Rajputs had already been gathering provisions and strengthening the defences. When Mahmud's peace terms became known, the Rajputs, unwilling to accept Islam, continued their preparations for a defensive war.

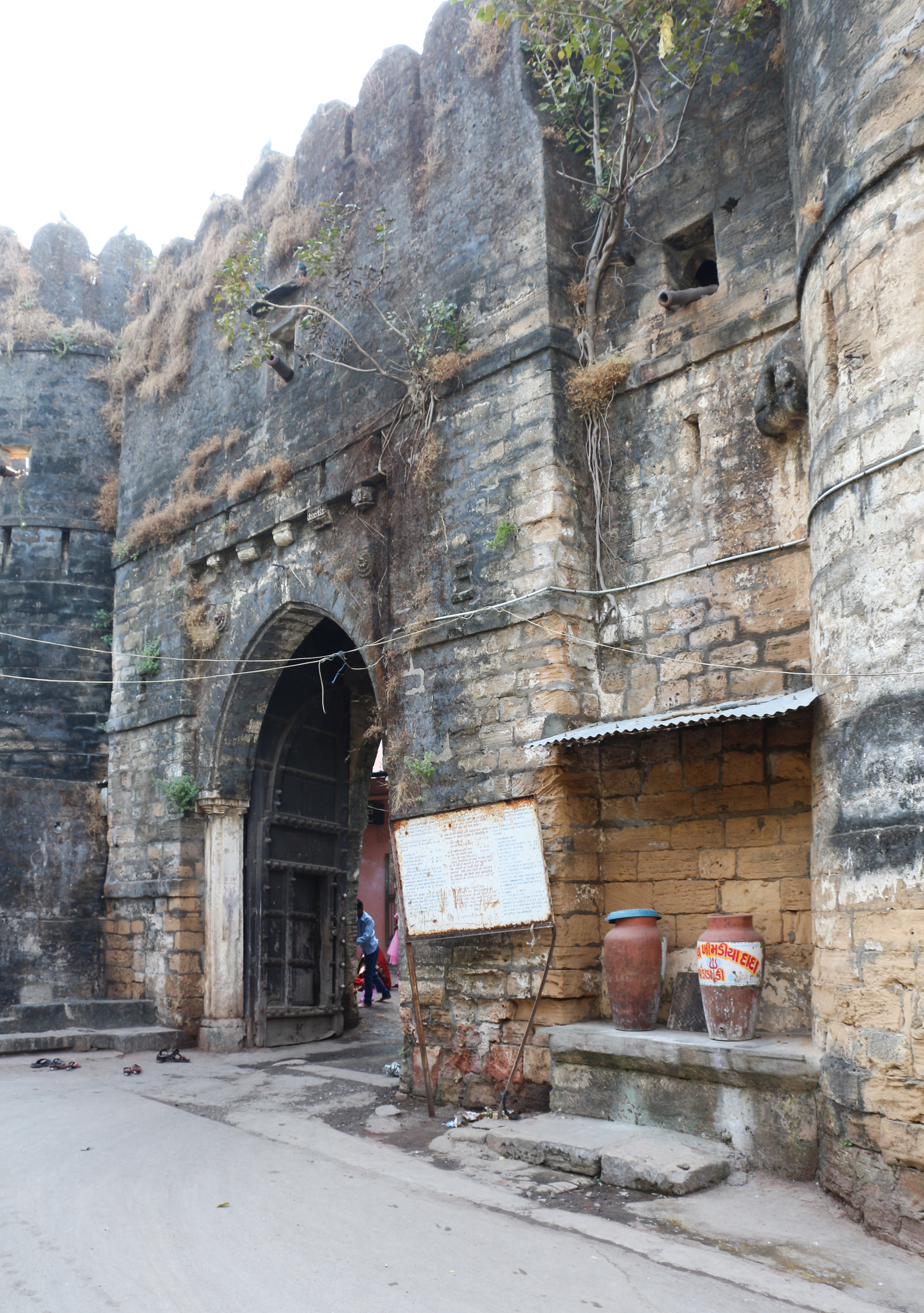
Gate of Uparkot Fort.

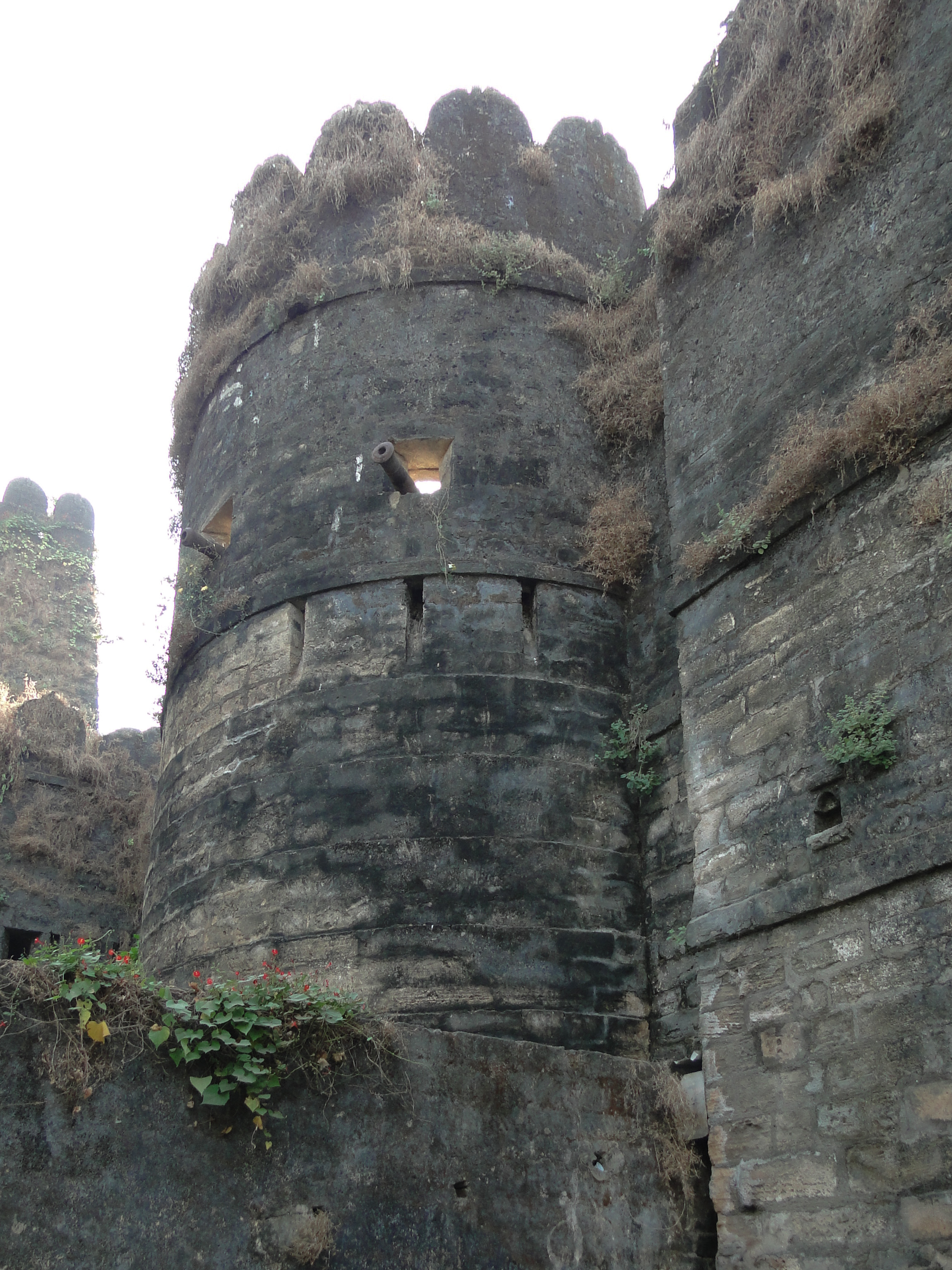
Tower of Uparkot Fort

=== Siege of Junagadh ===
In the morning Sultan Mahmud awaited a reply from Rao Mandalik. As no reply arrived, he besieged the fortress of Uparkot in Junagadh. Mahmud hoped that Vishal would assist him against his own master. Thus, he laid siege to Junagadh instead of Girnar. The Rajputs adopted different strategy. They attacked in groups and retreated into the fort. Fighting continued in this manner for two days. On the third day Mahmud Shah himself directed the fighting from morning until late evening and succeeded in repealing the Rajput attacks. He pitched his camp close under the walls and ordered trenches to be dug and protective galleries to be constructed. These measures failed to prevent the Rajputs attacks. On one occasion they penetrated the trench of Alam Khan Faruqi killing him and then withdrew into the fort. The stones launched by the Rajputs from their mangonel fell near the royal tent and damaged the Sultan's camp. Mahmud received none of the support he had expected from Vishal, who had invited the attack. He wrote letters to Khudawand Khan at Ahmedabad seeking advice. Khudawand Khan asked for details of the troop dispositions and advised the Sultan to reorganise the commandants of the trenches.

The garrison was greatly reduced, and Rao Mandalika had lost all hope of defending the fort. He sent a peace offer, which the Sultan rejected. Mahmud then demanded that the Rao either accept Islam or surrender the fort. Rao Mandalik was prepared to accept neither term. His treacherous prime minister Vishal advised him to surrender Junagadh and retire to Girnar, which was stronger and better supplied with provisions. An envoy was therefore sent to request that Mahmud allow the Rajputs to retire safely to Girnar with their women, children and belongings. According to Nizamuddin Ahmad, Rao Mandalika promised to hand over the fort of Junagadh once it had been evacuated. The Sultan welcomed the proposal and guaranteed them a safe retreat. Other chroniclers are silent on the formal surrender. After evacuating the fort, the Rajputs began the move towards Girnar with their families. They had hardly crossed half the distance up the hill when Mahmud ordered a surprise attack. (Note: According to Edward Clive Bayley the Rajputs left without formally surrendering Junagadh, but Nizamuddin Ahmad’s account shows they evacuated only after surrendering the fort, making Bayley’s defence unconvincing. Fazlullah Lutfullah Faridi translator of Mirat-i-Sikandari noted that such planned breaches of faith against non-Muslims were often viewed as virtues by Muslim rulers of the time. In medieval warfare and politics, ethical norms had little to no effect. From a purely political standpoint, the conquest of Junagadh was seen as essential for Gujarat’s security, and Mahmud adopted Machiavellian policy to achieve it. (Chaube 1975, pp. 58–59)) Surrounded by the enemy, the Rajputs were forced to take up arms in self-defence. Rao Mandalik continued the march while a portion of the army defended. The Gujarati soldiers defeated the Rajputs. Both sides suffered heavy casualties. Rao Mandalika succeeded in reaching Girnar with his remaining followers, their wives and children.

=== Siege of Girnar ===
After defeating a band of Rajput, the Gujarati army arrived near the fort of Girnar and laid siege to it. Sultan Mahmud also arrived to direct the operation. The Rajputs adopted the same sortie tactics against the besiegers. As the siege continued their provisions ran short. Rao Mandalika, devastated by the prolonged resistance fully realized Mahmud's determination to conquer the territory at any cost. He had no other choice but to seek terms. He therefore begged quarter for the garrison. The Sultan agreed to grant it on condition that he should accept the Islam. Left with no other alternative, Rao Mandalika accepted the Sultan's proposal. He stepped down from the fort and paid homage and handed over the fort's key to him on 4 December 1470.

== Aftermath ==
Rao Mandalika's submission brought the whole state of Junagadh directly under the Sultanate's authority. This marked the end of the Chudasama dynasty which ruled Kathiawar about six centuries. The annexation extended Gujarat's boundaries to the sea. The Rao accepted Islam. He accompanied the Sultan to Ahmedabad and became a follower of the saint Shah Alam. He formally accepted Islam by visiting the residence of Shah Alam. In 1471 AD Mahmud Begada conferred the title of Khan-i-Jahan on Rao Mandalik and assigned him a suitable jagir for his maintenance. Sultan Mahmud, who shared distaste for idol-worship thus removed all the golden idols from the Rao's private temples. These were sold and the money distributed among his soldiers. The Rao's son Bhupatsingh held the Jagir of Sili Bagsara Chovisi and was appointed in the office of collecting revenue in Kathiawar. He used to live in Junagadh. Bhupatsingh retained the title of Rao of Sorath and as Thanadar under Gujarat Sultanate. His descendants are known under the title of Raizadahs. Their jagirdars in Chorwad and Keshod lasted till 1609 AD. The Hindu chiefs of Kathiawar started paying tribute. He invited Qadis, Sayyids and scholars to settle in Junagarh, built palace, mosque and constructed an outer defensive wall called Jahapanah. To secure roads plagued by robbers, he founded Mahmudabad on the Wartak river. Tatar Khan was first appointed Thanadar. After some time, he was replaced by Prince Khalil Khan. Junagadh which was surrounded by hills and forests was turned it into a beautiful town and renamed Mustafabad. Rao Mandalika lived and died at Ahmedabad. His tomb located in the Kandoi Ol at the beginning of Kalupur Road near the Manek Chok is now a venerated shrine.

== See also ==
- Siege of Barur
- Siege of Champaner
- Conquest of Dwarka

== Bibliography ==
- Chaube, J. (1975). History of Gujarat Kingdom, 1458-1537. Munshiram Manoharlal Publishers. ISBN 978-0-88386-573-6.
- Commissariat, M. S. (1938). A History of Gujarat. Vol. I. Ahmadabad: Longmans Green & Co. Ltd.
- Dosabhai, Edalji (1986) [1894]. A History of Gujarat (PDF). Kessinger Publishing. ISBN 978-1-4367-3303-8.
- Singhji, Virbhadra (1994). The Rajputs of Saurashtra. Popular Prakashan. ISBN 978-81-7154-546-9.
- Rajyaghor, S. B. (1975). Gujarat State Gazetteers: Junagadh District. Ahmedabad: Directorate of Government Print., Stationery and Publications, Gujarat State.
- Wilberforce-Bell, Harold (1916). The History of Kathiawad from the Earliest Times. W. Heinemann.
- Habib, Mohammad; Nizami, Khaliq Ahmad (1970). A Comprehensive History of India. Vol. 5, Part 2. People's Publishing House.
