= Ranpur, Gujarat =

Ranpur
- town
- Location in Gujarat, India Ranpur (India)
- Coordinates: 22.375160°N 71.689810°E
- Country: India
- State: Gujarat
- District: Botad district

Population
  - Total: 30,000

Languages
  - Official: Gujarati, Hindi
- Time zone: UTC+5:30 (IST)
- PIN: 382245
- Vehicle registration: GJ - 33
- Nearest city: Dhandhuka, Limbdi, Botad, Surendranagar
- Literacy: 81.3%
- Website: gujaratindia.com

Ranpur is a town located on the bank of the river Bhadar in Botad district, Gujarat, India. Ranpur is little city of botad district.

== History ==
Ranaji, founder of Ranpur

Ranpur is said to have been founded, about the beginning of the fourteenth century, by Ranaji Gohil, a Rajput chieftain, the ancestor of the Bhavnagar State family. The forefathers of this Ranaji, who claimed descent from Shalivahan (79 AD) were, in the thirteenth century, driven by the Rathors from their seat in Khedgarh on the Luni River about ten miles from Balotra in Marwar. Retreating south under their chief Sejakji they took refuge with Raja Kalat, the Chudasma ruler of Junagadh. Raja Kalat treated the strangers with kindness, and calling it Sejakpur, settled Sejakji on the site of the present Ranpur in 1194. Ranaji, Sejakji's son, married the daughter of Dhanaji Mer koli patel Dhandhuka, and strengthening Sejakpur with a fort called it Ranpur. Mokhadaji Gohil, Ranaji's son, increased the power of his clan and carried their capital south to Piram Island and Ghogha. On the sea he became a noted pirate, and bringing down on himself the wrath of Muhammad bin Tughluq, was defeated and slain about 1347. Though the head of their clan was killed, the Gohils kept their hold on Ranpur.

More than a hundred years later another Ranaji ruling in Ranpur, by his Rajput pride and hate of Islam, enraged Mahmud Begada (1459–1511) and was defeated and slain, and his castle and town razed to the ground. Shortly after this Halaji and Lakhdarji, Ranaji's nephews and chiefs of Muli, befriending some Jat refugees, incurred the anger of the ruler of Sindh. Hearing of his advance against them, the brothers retired to the hills, but were pursued and defeated by the Sindh force, and Halaji carried off prisoner. Lakhdarji, by the help of Mahmud Begada, redeemed his brother. And he adopting the king's religion, Islam, was restored to Ranpur and founded the family of the present Ranpur Muslims. About the middle of the seventeenth century, Mughal viceroy Azam Khan the 23rd Viceroy (1635–1642) who ruled Ahmedabad, to overawe the Kathi freebooters raised (1610–1642) the castle of Shahpur whose ruins still ornament the town. About a hundred years later, during decay of Mughal Empire, the Wadhwan chief attacked Ranpur. Hard pressed the Muslim chief Alambhai applied for help to Damaji Rao Gaekwad. Damaji came and saved Ranpur. But so high a sum did he claim for his services, that to pay it Alambhai had to part with his chief town and castle. Ranpur remained with the Gaekwad till, in 1802, it was made over to the British East India Company. The people were almost entirely cultivators, Sunni Bohoras, Kumbhars, and a few Sathvaras at that time. On the raised strip of land between Bhadar and Goma rivers, the European houses were built by Mr. Jackson, Collector of Ahmedabad, around 1830 which no longer exists.

When India became independent in 1947, the state was merged with Ahmedabad district of Bombay State and later Gujarat state. Ranpur had become a Taluka of Botad district established on 15 August 2013.

== Demographics ==
According to Census 2011, it has population of 16,944.

== Structures and inscriptions ==
Azam Khan's castle to the south of the village at the meeting of the Bhadar and the Goma, looks from the outside not unlike one of the old south of Scotland towers. The walls, three to four feet thick of stone and cement as hard as stone, enclosing a large area, rise on the north fifty feet above the riverbed. The lower walls are in good order, but in many places the massive towers and overhanging battlements are in ruins. The east gate opens into a courtyard eighty feet long and 277 broad. Within this is a second courtyard 277 feet long by 230 wide.

In its inner wall is a handsome gateway over which was a marble slab with these words in Persian: He is the Creator and the Allknowing. The great Lord A'zam Khan, the Lord of his time, one, the like of whom was never given birth to by a bride of this world, the fearless lion, the bravest of the brave, and the lord of the earth, the Khan of high rank, may his life be long, asked me to find out the date of this castle, from which be ever kept off the power of the evil eye. Plunging into the ocean of thought I marked with the seal of my heart: Aazam-ul- bildd, Greatest of Cities. These words represent 1048 H, that is AD 1640.

Within the gateway is a mosque with a reservoir and the grave of a saint named Ragushah Pir. An inscription above the mosque's pulpit reads in Persian: "God is great. In the reign of the king, splendid as Jamshed, the just and the generous Shahab-ud-din Muhammad II, the lord of the time, Shah Jahan the valiant warrior, may the Almighty maintain his rule, in the month of Zil Haj in the year 1050 H. (AD 1642), the humble slave of the Almighty, A'zam Khan, during the term of his government of Gujarat, laid the foundation of this sacred mosque in this castle of Shahapur, and finished it that the servants of the True God may worship Him."

To the west of the mosque, is a strong roughly-built bath with a cellar and under-ground passage, and near the passage a shrine to Mahadev and to a Mata. On the wall of the fort, overhanging the river, was a marble slab with these words in Persian: God is great. A'zam Khan, while Viceroy of Gujarat, began to build this bath on the 1st of the month of Jamddil A'khar and completed it at the end of Muharram 1052 H. (AD 1644). Ye who see this place remember him kindly.

To the south of the bath is the Governor's house, afterwards used as an office. In front of it, stone-edgings still mark the shapes of flower-beds, and above the beds is a small terrace with round unpaved spaces for flowering shrubs. Close to the house, at the north-west corner of the fort, is a well, which, along stone channels, supplied water to the whole fort. On the bank of the river to the east of the village, is a well and the remains of a garden, also the work of A'zam Khan. On the well are these words in Persian: God is great. A'zam Khan the servant of God in the month of Shawwdl in the year 1051 H. (AD 1643) when Viceroy of Gujarat having built this well left it to the garden for a help to the people. A little beyond the well are some ruins said to mark the site of a Rajput or Muslim fort.

== Economy ==
Major sources of income in the village include engineering industries, local business polishing and farming. Bearing industries are also historically associated with Ranpur.

== Education ==
There is one Polytechnique, N.M. Gopani, which has more than 800 diploma students.
