= Conquest of Dwarka =

1473 military campaign in Gujarat

- Key locations in the conquest of Dwarka (1473) 1 Dwarka; 2 Bet Dwarka
Date	4 May – 6 October 1473 (5 months and 2 days)
Location	Dwarka, Bet Dwarka in Kathiawar, Gujarat
Result	Gujarat Sultanate victory: Fall of Rathore dynasty of Dwarka
Territorial changes	Okhamandal annexed to Gujarat Sultanate

Belligerents
Gujarat Sultanate	Rathore dynasty of Dwarka

Commanders and leaders
Mahmud Begada	Raja Bhim (executed)

Strength
Unknown but large army and naval fleet	Unknown but smaller army and naval fleet

Casualties and losses
Unknown	Heavy

The Conquest of Dwarka was a military campaign carried out in 1473 by Sultan Mahmud Begada of the Gujarat Sultanate against Raja Bhima of the Rathore principality centred on Dwarka in the Okhamandal region of present-day Gujarat.

Raja Bhim's domains extended from the coast of Arabian Sea to Khambhalia. The expedition was motivated by a combination of political, economic, and religious factors. Raja Bhim had expanded their territory and engaged in widespread piracy, repeatedly attacking Muslim pilgrim vessels bound for Mecca. Gujarat heavily dependent the coastal route for trade. Dwarka is also a holy pilgrim site for the Hindus. Mahmud Begada was eager to establish his authority in whole of Kathiawar, therefore was looking for opportunity to do it so. At one instance the pirates captured the ship of Maulana Mahmud Samarqandi, who reached the Sultan's court provided the immediate pretext for war.

On 14 May 1473, Mahmud advanced with a large army to punish Bhim. He captured Dwarka by surprise. Raja Bhim abandoned the city without serious resistance and took refuge on the nearby island of Bet Dwarka. The Sultan occupied Dwarka and assembled a large fleet. He then crossed to the island, defeated the Rajput forces in a naval and land engagement, and captured the fort. Raja Bhim escaped but was later captured. He was brought to Mustafabad and ultimately executed in Ahmedabad at the instance of Maulana Mahmud Samarqandi. The conquest brought Okhamandal under direct Gujarat control further extended the Sultanate's authority to the Arabian Sea coast. This marked the full subjugation of the Kathiawar by Mahmud Begada.

== Background ==
Sangaji was the strongest ruler of the Rathore dynasty of Dwarka. His kingdom expanded to Khambhalia. Earlier Gujarat sultans ignored Dwarka. After Sangaji's death, his weak son Raja Bhim succeeded him just as Mahmud Begada was expanding his kingdom. Determined to push Gujarat Sultanate's south-western border to the Arabian Sea, Mahmud made plans to conquer the kingdom. After the conquest of Junagadh, Gujarat and Dwarka shared a border. Bhupat Singh, son of Rao Mandalik, held a jagir in Sili Bagasara Chovisi and lived at Junagadh. Thus, there was also possibility of an alliance between the royal family of Junagadh and Dwarka. Gujarat was also depended on sea-trade with the Middle East. The infertile island of Bet Dwarka were dwelled by poor Wagher and Paghara Rajputs. They were notorious pirates who plundered Mecca-bound pilgrim ships. The Sultan knew this and he saw ensuring their safety as a religious duty. Raja Bhim held sway over this region and also over the pirates of Okhamandal. (Note: Okhamandal forms a somewhat isolated western coastal tract, bounded on the landward side by the Okha Ran and opening onto the Arabian Sea and the Gulf of Kutch, with Dwarka and Bet Dwarka as its principal centres.) Its capital Dwarka was a sacred centre of pilgrimage to which Hindus from all parts of India came to worship Krishna. Its traditions are said to be from the Mahabharata's times. The Sultan, however, regarded it as a place of idol-worship, which he found deeply offensive.

The chance came when pirates from Bet Dwarka attacked Maulana Mahmud Samarqandi's ship while returning to his native country Hormaz. He was a poet, philosopher and merchant serving in the court of the Bahmani rulers. They captured his wife and all their belongings and only let him go with his two toddler. The children were too small to walk, so the old man had to carry one a bit of the way, leave him, then go back for the other. After a hard 140-mile journey he finally reached Sultan Mahmud Begada's court and told his story. It really moved the Sultan. He pleaded to the Sultan to punish those pirates. The Sultan promised to launch an attack on the ruler of Dwarka. Then he took the Maulana and his kids to Ahmedabad and made arrangements for their wellbeing.

== Capture of Dwarka ==
On 14 May 1473, Sultan Mahmud set out with a large army against Dwarka. He launched a surprise attack and Raja Bhim being panicked could not gather his scattered troops stationed here and there. He did not even make efforts to defend his kingdom. He abandoned Dwarka and fled to take refuge on Bet Dwarka, with a few of his nobles tagging along. The Gujarati army marched straight into the city of Dwarka without any resistance and plundered the place. The grand buildings and the temples were demolished so are the idols broken into pieces. Large amount of treasure was taken by the victorious army. Mahmud Shah stayed there for four months to consolidate his new conquest and ordered a mosque to be built to spread Islam in Dwarka. He gathered boats from the nearby ports and built up his navy to conquer Bet Dwarka.

== Siege of Bet Dwarka ==
Raja Bhim organized to fight a long defensive war, and counterattack when the time was right. Sultan Mahmud decided to clear out this last pocket of resistance. He left Dwarka and set up camp at Amroh, a little coastal village about twenty miles away, right opposite the island. The place was crawling with lions, leopards, wolves, snakes and all sorts of wild animals. On the very first night his soldiers killed seven hundred snakes just inside the royal enclosure. Raja Bhim, supported by a strong flotilla, resolved to prevent the Gujarati forces from landing on Bet Dwarka. As soon as the vessels approached Amroh, the Sultan ordered his troops to besiege the island. The Rajputs advanced in their own ships to oppose the Gujarati advance. The fighting ensued with arrows and muskets. After offering strong resistance, the Rajputs were defeated by the superior arms and forced to withdraw into the fort of Bet Dwarka. The Gujarat soldiers then landed on the island and immediately advanced upon the fort in order to thwart the Rajputs' defensive preparations. Their sudden attack near the fortress created widespread panic among the defenders. The garrison was too confused to offer an effective resistance. Raja Bhim himself, equally confused and demoralised, fled on a boat with only a handful of followers. With no leadership, the remaining Rajputs continued to resist until they were killed in battle. Their women and children were put to death.

== Aftermath ==
Sultan Mahmud entered the fort with his men. Great abundant spoils fell into his hands again. His first released the wife of Maulana Mahmud Samarqandi and the other Muslim prisoners held by Raja Bhim. Unable to find Raja Bhim within the fort and learning of his flight, the Sultan despatched trusted soldiers in well-equipped vessels to pursue and capture the fugitive ruler of Dwarka. Overjoyed at their success, the Muslim soldiers proclaimed the adhan from the tops of the Hindu temples. The Rajputs had earlier brought several beautiful idols from Dwarka and installed them in the temples on the island. Sultan Mahmud ordered these temples to be demolished, and the idols broken. He ordered construction of a mosque before his departure. Malik Toghan Farhat-ul-Mulk was appointed in charge of both Dwarka and Bet Dwarka. Mahmud Begada completing his arrangements, returned to Dwarka with the family of the Maulana. After some time, he began return to Mustafabad. The Hindu kingdom of Dwarka was annexed to the Gujarat Sultanate. This laid the foundation of Muslim rule in Dwarka for the first time. Furthermore, Okhamandal was formally annexed into the domains of Gujarat Sultanate.

=== Execution of Raja Bhim ===
On 6 October 1473, Mahmud Begada arrived in Mustafabad with immense spoils and the family of Maulana Mahmud Samarqandi. Raja Bhim was also captured by the soldiers and brought there in chains. As the expedition had been undertaken at the request of Maulana Mahmud Samarqandi, the latter was summoned from Ahmadabad to reunite with his wife and identify the property he had lost. Raja Bhim was then handed over to Maulana Mahmud Samarqandi, who thanked the Sultan for his notable services to Islam. Unwilling to forgive the ruler of Dwarka, the Maulana had him sent to Muhafiz Khan, the governor of Ahmedabad. He instructed the manner of the punishment. According to Firishta, Raja Bhim was dragged round the city of Ahmedabad and afterwards hewn to pieces at the instance of Mahmud Samarqandi. Nizamuddin Ahmad further adds that the pieces were hung upon the gates of Ahmadabad.

== See also ==
- Siege of Barur
- Battle of Sanjan
- Conquest of Junagadh
- Siege of Champaner

== Bibliography ==
- Chaube, J. (1975). History of Gujarat Kingdom, 1458-1537. Munshiram Manoharlal Publishers. ISBN 978-0-88386-573-6.
- Commissariat, M. S. (1938). A History of Gujarat. Vol. I. Ahmadabad: Longmans Green & Co. Ltd.
- Dosabhai, Edalji (1986) [1894]. A History of Gujarat (PDF). Kessinger Publishing. ISBN 978-1-4367-3303-8.
- Burton-Page, J. (1957). ""Azīz" and the Sack of Dvārkā: A Seventeenth Century Hindi Version". Bulletin of the School of Oriental and African Studies, University of London. 20 (1/3): 145–157. ISSN 0041-977X.
- Haig, W. (1928). The Cambridge History of India: Turks and Afghans, edited by W. Haig. Vol. III. Cambridge University Press.
- Wilberforce-Bell, Harold (1916). The History of Kathiawad from the Earliest Times. W. Heinemann.
