= Molesalam =

Molesalam Rajput
Total population
- 108,000

Regions with significant populations
- India

Languages
- Gujarati

Religion
- Sunni Islam

The Molesalam are a Muslim Rajput (Muslim Indo-Aryan) community found in the state of Gujarat in India. They also refer to themselves as Molesalam Thakur and sometimes Molesalam Girasia or मॉलेसलाम (Grasiya). There is some documentation of "nomadic Molesalam", but it is unclear from a single source of the relationship of this nomadic group with the "origin community".

The Molesalam were targeted in an oppressive shuddhi ‘purification’ campaign launched by the Arya Samaj Hindu organization in 1908. In March 1926, the Molesalam held an anti-shuddhi conference in Charotar, led by a prominent leader of their community and member of the Bombay Legislative Assembly, Sardar Naharsinhji Ishvarsinhji.
