= Meliga =

Ra of Saurashtra (reign: 1400-1416 CE)

- Ra of Saurashtra
- Reign: 1400–1416 CE
- Predecessor: Mandalika II
- Successor: Jayasimha II
- Issue: Jayasimha II, Mahipala III
Era name and dates
- Vikram Samvat: 1456–1472
- Dynasty: Chudasama dynasty
- Father: Mokalasimha
- Religion: Hinduism

Ra Meliga, also known as Melaga or Maleka, was a Chudasama king of Saurashtra region of western India who reigned from 1400 CE to 1416 CE (VS 1456 to VS 1472). He remove his capital from Vanthali back to Junagadh, from which place he expelled the thanadar appointed by Gujarat Sultan. Thus Gujarat Sultan Ahmad Shah I sent an army against Junagadh. He captured Vanthali and later Junagadh was besieged. Meliga left to a fort on Girnar hill which was inaccessible to the forces. So the forces left and placed two officers in Junagadh to collect tribute. Meliga died and was succeeded by his son Jayasimha II in 1416 CE.

== Reign ==
Meliga succeeded his elder brother Mandalika II in 1400 CE. His father Mokalasimha had to move the capital from Junagadh to Vanthali due to order from the Governor of Gujarat Zafar Khan on behalf of Delhi Sultan Firuz Shah Tughluq who placed a thanadar. It seems that Meliga had played no role when Zafar Khan attacked Somnath temple in 1402 CE which was under repair. Meliga expelled the thanadar from Junagadh and again made it his capital. According to the Mandalika Kavya, he had sheltered a Jhala chieftain (probably Satarsal) fleeing from Gujarat Sultan Ahmad Shah I. Mirat-i-Sikandari tells that, in 1413-14 CE, Ahmad Shah marched against Junagadh. On this occasion, Melinga fought a pitched battle with Ahmad Shah at Vanthali but was defeated and fled to Junagadh. Vanthali was taken by Ahmad Shah who then marched to Junagadh and took the lower fortress (the Uparkot but the Raja escaped by fleeing to the upper fortress of Girnar. But the Mirat-i-Sikandri adds, 'The greater part of the zamindars of Sorath became submissive and obedient and consented to service.' Ahmad Shah left two officers, Sayad Ábûl Khair and Sayad Kásim, were left to collect the zamindar's tribute, salami and returned to his capital, Ahmedabad. The inscriptions (VS 1469/1413 CE) on five paliyas (memorial stones) of people died in battle at Vanthali corroborate this event.

The Mandalik Kavya, however, omits all account of the fight at Vanthali and represents that Meliga defeated Ahmad Shah and plundered his baggage but this is probably an exaggeration based on the Meliga's escape to the Girnar fortress and his avoidance of capture. In the Uparkot inscription (VS 1507/1451 CE), Meliga is styled the Yadav Rana of Jirandurg. He was succeeded by his son Jayasimha II in 1416 CE.

Other inscriptions on paliyas mentioning his name are located at Mesavana (VS 1470/1414 CE), Vaghelana (VS 1471/1415 CE) as well as on a stone in well at Vanthali dated VS 1472/1416 CE. He is also mentioned in genealogy of Revati Kund near Damodar Kund, Junagadh (VS 1472/1417 CE) and Neminath Temple inscription (c. VS 1510/c. 1454 CE) on Girnar.
