= Mahmud Begada's campaign of Sindh =

1472 conflict in Sindh

Expedition to Sindh
Date	1472
Location	Coastal region of Sindh and the Rann of Kutch
Result	Gujarat Sultanate victory
Territorial changes	Status quo ante bellum

Belligerents
Gujarat Sultanate	Notqul-qawwas tribe

Commanders and leaders
Mahmud Begada	Unnamed tribal leaders

Strength
1,000 cavalry	approx. 40,000

Casualties and losses
Light	Heavy; Many killed; women and children taken prisoner

Mahmud Begada's campaign of Sindh (1472) was a short military campaign led by Sultan Mahmud Begada of the Gujarat Sultanate against the Notqul-qawwas tribe that had rebelled against his maternal grandfather Jam Nizamuddin II, the Samma ruler of Sindh.

Marching through the desert with a selected force of cavalry, Mahmud reached the frontier of Sindh. There the rebels largely either fled or hid upon learning of his approach. The Gujarati troops killed those who remained, imprisoning the women and children. The revolt effectively ended. Mahmud declined to annex any territory. He received gift from the Samma ruler and returned to Junagadh.

== Background ==
The Gujarat Sultanate and Samma dynasty never formed any diplomatic ties. To counter the growing Mongol pressure in lower Sind, Jam Nizamuddin II formed a close alliance with Gujarat by marrying his daughter Bibi Mughali to Sultan Muhammad Shah II and two others to Shah Alam and Qaisar Khan Faruqi of Khandesh. Mahmud Shah was born to Bibi Mughali, the Samma princess, and thus maintained friendly relations with his maternal grandfather, Jam Nizamuddin.

== Campaign ==
The Notqul-qawwas, a coastal tribal people of Sindh and Gujarat, were independent pirates who raided as far as Gujarat's borders. In 1472, around 40,000 members of the Notqul-qawwas tribe rose in revolt against Jam Nizamuddin of Sindh. Mahmud Begada decided to crush the uprising both for his own security and to support his grandfather Jam Nizamuddin. He personally led a large army and reached Shivur. Because the route crossed a vast desert, he selected 1,000 cavalry, each trooper given an extra horse and a week's provisions. After making these arrangements, the Sultan advanced and encamped on the frontier of Sind. A fast camel rider spotted the royal army thus informing the rebels of the approaching Gujarati force. The tribesmen were skilled archers but untrained for battle against a well-equipped army. Most fled, while others hid. When Mahmud arrived the next morning, he found their tents abandoned. His soldiers dragged out the hidden rebels and killed them. The women and children were taken prisoner and sent to Junagadh. The camp was plundered, and the rebellion was completely suppressed.

== Aftermath ==
After this success, some nobles suggested annexation of Sindh to the sultanate. Sultan Mahmud turned down the idea since the queen mother's family of Sindh was ruling over the region. He wanted to maintain good relations with his grandfather and the royal family. While Sultan Mahmud was staying in his camp, Jam Nizamuddin sent his envoy with valuable gifts for him. He then returned to Junagadh.

== See also ==
- Arghun dynasty

== Bibliography ==
- Commissariat, M. S. (1938). A History of Gujarat. Vol. I. Ahmadabad: Longmans Green & Co. Ltd.
- Chaube, J. (1975). History of Gujarat Kingdom, 1458-1537. Munshiram Manoharlal Publishers. ISBN 978-0-88386-573-6.
- Haig, W. (1928). The Cambridge History of India: Turks and Afghans, edited by W. Haig. Vol. III. Cambridge University Press.
- Majumdar, Ramesh Chandra (1967) [1960]. The History and Culture of the Indian People. Vol. 6 (2nd ed.). Bombay: Bharatiya Vidya Bhavan.
- Habib, Mohammad; Nizami, Khaliq Ahmad (1970). A Comprehensive History of India. Vol. 5, Part 2. People's Publishing House.
