= Mandalika III =

Last Ra of Junagadh from 1451 to 1472

- Ra of Saurashtra
- Reign: 1451–1472 CE
- Predecessor: Mahipala III
- Successor: Tatar Khan as Thanadar of Gujarat Sultanate; Bhupatsingh as Jagirdar
- Burial: Manek Chowk, Ahmedabad
- Spouse: Kunta Devi; Soma Sahiba (Umabai); Ramabai
Era name and dates
- Vikram Samvat: 1507–1527
Regnal name
- Khan Jahan; "Ra Gangajalio"
- Dynasty: Chudasama dynasty
- Father: Mahipala III
- Religion: Hinduism; Sunni Islam (after 1472)

Mandalika III, called by the epithet Ra Gangajalio, was a Chudasama king of Saurashtra region of western India who reigned from 1451 CE to 1472 CE (VS 1507 to VS 1527). His capital was at Junagadh.

Mandalika was married to a daughter of Arjun Bhim Gohil of Arthila, named Kunta Devi, who had been brought up in the house of one Duda Gohil, her uncle. Mandalika's first military exploit was an expedition against Sangan Vadhel of Bet Dwarka, because that chieftain had omitted to send a present on the occasion of his installation. A successful attack was made against Bet Dwarka, and Sangan Vadhel was taken prisoner but afterwards released, and Mandalika returned in triumph to Junagadh. He was sent by the Gujarat Sultan to fight his relative Duda Gohil of Arthila whom he defeated and killed. He sacked Arthila and the Gohil family had to move to Lathi.

During his reign, Junagadh was attacked by Gujarat Sultan Mahmud Begada three times and finally captured in 1472. He was ordered to be converted to Islam and was given the name Jahan Khan, Junagadh was renamed Mustafabad and Saurashtra was renamed Sorath. He died at Ahmedabad and was buried at Manek Chowk in Ahmedabad. He was the last independent Chudasama ruler of Saurashtra. He had married Soma Sahiba (Umabai), daughter of Bhimsinh of Kuva and Ramabai, daughter of Maharana Kumbhakarna of Mewar.

== Reign ==
Find spots of inscriptions in Gujarat issued during the reign of Mandalika III

Mandalika came to the throne when his father Mahipala III abdicated in his favour in 1451 CE (1507 CE) and went to forest.

When he was of a fitting age he was married to Kunta Devi, the daughter of Arjun, son of Bhim Gohil. Arjun had died fighting with the Muslims and his daughter had been brought up in Duda Gohil's house. Duda was brother of Arjun and was chieftain of Arthila.

=== Subdues Sangan Vadhel of Bet Dwarka ===
During Mahipala's life, he installed Mandalika on the throne and all the neighbouring chiefs offered presents except Sangan Vadhel of Bet Dwarka. Mandalika accordingly marched against him and defeated him and took him prisoner after vanquishing him in single combat. Then after taking from him much plunder, he released him and returned victoriously to Junagadh. The Mirat-i-Sikandri speaks of Bhim, the son of Sagar which is probably Sangan.

=== Defeats Duda Gohil of Arthila ===
At this time the Sultan of Ahmedabad sent him a message complaining that Duda Gohil was ravaging his territory and requesting Mandalika to restrain him. Mandalika replied that the Sultan's enemies were his enemies and at once marched against him. Dudo putting on his armour marched to oppose him; after some fighting between the two armies, Dudo came up to Mandalika and said to him, that he must not consider him like Sangan Vadhel that he, Mandalika, was but a youth and was besides the husband of his niece and might have a son by her, and hence that it would be early for him to die now, he therefore counselled him to withdraw from the battle. Mandalika however replied that he was the son of a Kshatriya and therefore could not retreat. The warriors then engaged Dudo begged Mandalika to strike first but Mandalika replied, 'If you do not strike first you will never again get a chance'. On this Dudo made a blow at Mandalika which he warded and dealt Dudo such a blow that his head fell from his body. Dudo's army was now put to the rout and Mandalika returned and made a triumphal entry into Junagadh after sacking and destroying Arthila. The Gohil dynasty moved their capital to Lathi.

He now desired to marry another wife and after consulting his ministers made proposals for the hand of Soma Sahiba (Umabai), daughter of Bhimsinh of Kuva, who was then (as his father Vanvirji was ruling at Kuva) residing at Sitha. Her father agreed and finally Mandalika went to Sitha and married her with great pomp. He did not, however, have a son with her and therefore married many other Chandravamsi Jhalas and Suryavamsi Gohils, (Note: As said in Mandalika Kavya of Gangadhar.) but still remained sonless. However eventually he had sons.

=== Subdues Sangan Vadhel again ===
Sangan Vadhel, now again rebelled, and Mandalika marched against him and occupied Bet, Sangan Vadhel fleeing with his family. He, however obtained foreign aid, and again opposed Mandalika as he was returning, but Mandalika routed him and again took him prisoner, but again released him.

In his reign flourished the celebrated Narsinh Mehta, a Vaishnava devotee, very famous in Gujarat.

=== Tale of Vinjal Vajo ===
It is said that Vinjal Vajo, chief of Patan Somnath, was a great friend of Mandalika. Vinjal was attacked by leprosy and consequently resolved to make a pilgrimage to Banaras, and failing to be cured there to perish in the snows of Kailash. The Brahmans, however, told him that before doing this he must first make a pilgrimage to Girnar. Vinjal was anxious to avoid doing this as his friend Mandalika would see him in his diseased state. But as the Brahmans insisted that it was necessary for him to visit Girnar, he went secretly there and bathed at the Damodar Kund and bestowed a small gold image of an elephant on the Brahmans in charity. After his departure, a quarrel arose among the Brahmans as to a division of the gold and the question was referred to the Mandalika who at once asked who gave the gold elephant. On hearing that it was Vinjal Vajo, he set out after him. When he reached the stream, now called Gangajalio, between Vadal and Kathrota, he there met a man bearing his daily supply of water of Ganga river which was sent to him each day. In his anxiety to overtake Vinjal, he bathed with his clothes on i.e. simply poured the water over himself, clothes and all, and went on to Jetalsar where he found Vinjal Vajo encamped. Vinjal begged him not to approach him as he had the loathsome disease of leprosy. But Mandalika would not be denied and advanced and embraced him and immediately Vinjal's leprosy was cleansed. From this circumstance, the stream where Mandalika met the carrier of water of Ganga has been ever since called the Gangajalio and Ra Mandalika also is called by epithet, Ra Gangajalio.

== Fall of Junagadh ==
=== Folklore ===
There are two distinct stories told of the causes of the fall of Junagadh but the most popular is that told by Ranchhodji Diwan in the Tarikh-i-Sorath besides being known by every bard and Charan within the peninsula.

Nagbai was a beautiful and chaste Charan woman of the village of Monia near Sarsai. Mandalika who had heard much of the beauty of her son's wife, went to Monia on the pretext of hunting in order to see her and was so inflamed by her charms that he placed his hand on her bosom. She turned instantly away from him and Nagbai cursed him saying, 'The bride of thy good fortune shall turn away her face from thee even as I do now and will unite herself with the Muhammadan kings'. So saying she left him and Mandalika returned discomfited and ashamed to Junagadh. The following duha is also said to have been said by Nagbai. It is interesting both because Junagadh is styled Gadh and because the cure of Vinjal Vajo is mentioned:

Oh! Lord of the Gadh, your body was so pure from water of Ganga, that you cleansed Vinja of leprosy, but bestowed on me nails, Oh Mandalika? (Note: The Gujarati duha runs: ગંગાજળિયા ગઢેચા, (તારૂં) હૂતું પંડ પવિત્ર, વીજાનાં રગત ગયાં, મુણે વાળા માંડળિક!)

Another story is that Mandalika seduced Manmohan, the beautiful wife of his minister Vania Visal, who in revenge invited Sultan Mahmud Begada to invade Mandalika's dominions and thus betrayed his master. There is no historical basis for this folklore.

=== Mahmud Begada captures Junagadh ===
In 1467 CE, Gujarat Sultan Mahmud Begada attacked Junagadh but on receiving the submission of Mandalika returned to his capital Ahmedabad. In the following year, hearing that Mandalika continued to visit his idol temple in state with a golden umbrella and other ensigns of royalty, Mahmud despatched an army to Junagaḍh, and the chief sent the obnoxious umbrella to the king, accompanied by fitting presents.

But in 1469 CE, he resolved to conquer the country and marched there with a large force. While Mahmud Begada was on the march the Mandalika suddenly joined him, and asking why the Sultan was so bent on his destruction when he had committed no fault, agreed to do whatever Mahmud Begada might command. The king replied there is no fault like infidelity, and ordered Mandalika to embrace Islam. The chief, now thoroughly alarmed, fled by night and made his way into Girnar. In 1472–73 CE, after a siege of nearly two years, forced by the failure of his stores, Mandalika surrendered, and his dominions were annexed to the Gujarat Sultanate. He was injured and was securely saved by his soldiers. It is said that he wondered Saurashtra for two years to regain power. But Muslim historians note that Mandalika himself was converted to Islam and received the title of Khan Jahan. He moved to Ahmedabad with the Sultan and lies buried in the Manek Chowk at Ahmedabad.

== Succession ==
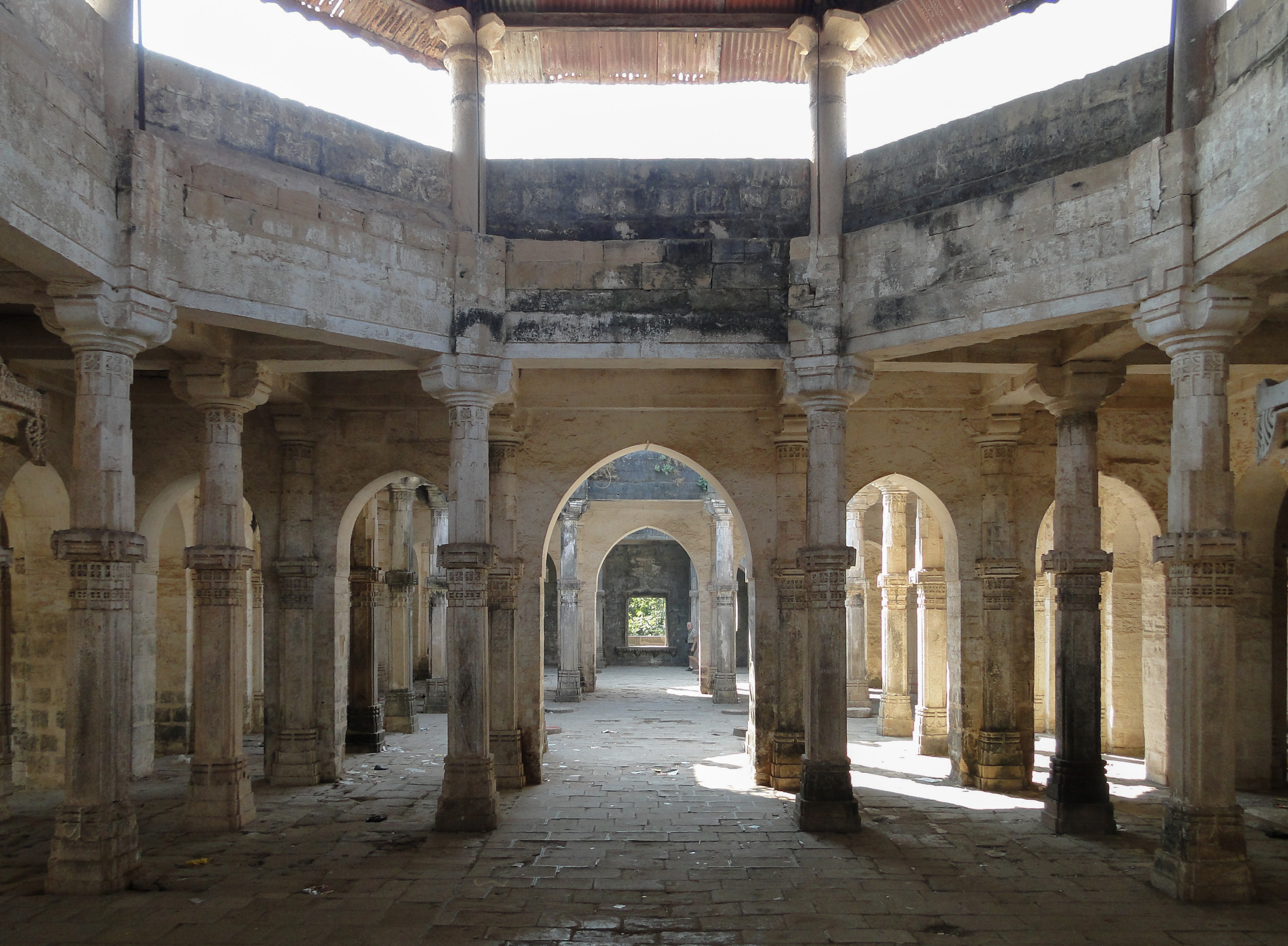
Jama Masjid of Uparkot built by Mahmud Begada

Sultan Mahmud Begada changed the name of Junagadh to Mustafabad and built the fortifications round the town and the Jumma mosque in the Uparkot. And for a short time, he took up his residence there and caused his nobles also to construct palaces in that town. He sent also for Syad Kazis and other Muslims and gave them jagirs and official appointments and directed them to spread the religion of Islam.

From this date to the close of the Gujarat Sultanate, Junagadh was governed by an official appointed direct from Ahmedabad styled Thanadar. This official collected the tribute and revenue of the crown domain but the Sultan also placed Mandalika's descendant Bhupatsingh in Junagadh as a Jagirdar. The first Thanadar was Tatar Khan, an adopted son of the Sultan and after him Mirza Khalil, the eldest son of the Sultan who afterwards succeeded him under the title of Sultan Muzaffar Shah II. Prince Khalil during his tenure of office founded the village called Khalilpur. The Jagir allotted to Bhupatasimha was the Sil Bagasra Chovisi and his descendants, known as Raizada, continued to live there but he resided in Junagadh. Bhupatasimha died in 1525 CE was succeeded by his son Navaghana (died 1552 CE). Navaghana was succeeded by Shrisimha (died 1586 CE).

== In popular culture ==
Mandalika Kavya by Gangadhar is an epic on Mandalika III. Gujarati writer Jhaverchand Meghani had written Ra Gangajalio (1939), a novel based on the life of Mandalika.
