= Siege of Barur =

1464 siege in Gujarat

| Date | 1464 |
| Location | Barur (in modern Pardi, Valsad district, Gujarat) 20°31′07″N 72°56′45″E |
| Result | Gujarat Sultanate victory |
| Territorial changes | Barur becomes tributary of Gujarat Sultanate |

Belligerents
| Gujarat Sultanate | Kingdom of Barur |

Commanders and leaders
| Mahmud Begada | Chief of Barur (surrendered) |

Strength
| Unknown | Unknown |

Casualties and losses
| Unknown | Unknown |
- Location within Gujarat Siege of Barur (India)

The Siege of Barur (1464) was a military campaign launched by Sultan Mahmud Begada of the Gujarat Sultanate against the hill fort of Barur, a strategic principality adjacent to the port of Daman. Prompted by local piracy that threatened maritime trade and concerns over Portuguese influence in the region, Mahmud Begada undertook the expedition. The fort was besieged prompting the chief to surrender. Following the victory, Mahmud Begada restored the chief to his throne in exchange for annual tribute.

== Background ==
The principality of Barur was situated next to the port of Daman, where local piracy frequently disrupted maritime trade. Mahmud Begada wanted to secure the territory was vital both to safeguard merchant shipping and to prevent the Portuguese from gaining a strategic advantage over Gujarat. The political and commercial importance drove the Sultan to conquer Barur. Edward Clive Bayley further attributes the conquest to religious zeal, suggesting the Sultan saw it as his duty to transform Dar-ul-Harb (land of war) into Dar-ul-Islam (land of Islam). Barur's strategic location and impact on regional commerce, the political and economic aspects were the main purpose of this campaign.

== Siege ==
In 1464 AD, Sultan Mahmud Begada marched to lay siege to the fort. The nobles strongly opposed the campaign who warned him about the difficult roads and the formidable strength of the defences. Undeterred, Mahmud Shah personally gathered massive stockpiles of arms and led the campaign himself. The initial siege proved difficult due to the fort’s challenging geography, and the garrison put up a fierce resistance. A series of skirmishes followed, but neither side could break the stalemate. The chief sought refugee inside the hill-fortress. The turning point came when Sultan Mahmud personally led a detachment of soldiers up the hills, taking the defenders by surprise. The Sultan's unexpected presence at the height of the mountain created widespread panic among the defenders. Realizing he could no longer hold the stronghold, the Hindu chief of Barur surrendered, sending his old mother to present the keys of the fort to the Sultan.

== Aftermath ==
Pleased by the submission, Sultan Mahmud treated the chief of Barur with generosity. The chief offered many presents, but the Sultan declined the offers. He granted him a khilat and a golden belt. Mahmud Begada was politically aware that annexing the state could drive smaller Hindu rulers into forming alliances against him. He focused on asserting his suzerainty until he had completed the conquests of major strongholds like Junagarh and Champaner. Thus, the Sultan restored the fort and simply fixed an annual tribute before returning victorious to his capital.

== See also ==
- Siege of Champaner
- Siege of Diu (1531)
- Siege of Diu (1538)
- Siege of Diu (1546)

== Bibliography ==
- Chaube, J. (1975). History of Gujarat Kingdom, 1458-1537. Munshiram Manoharlal Publishers. ISBN 978-0-88386-573-6.
- Habib, Mohammad; Nizami, Khaliq Ahmad (1970). A Comprehensive History of India. Vol. 5, Part 2. People's Publishing House.
- Haig, W. (1928). The Cambridge History of India: Turks and Afghans, edited by W. Haig. Vol. III. Cambridge University Press.
