= Neminath Jain Temple, Girnar =

Jain temple on Girnar hill in Gujarat, India

Neminath Jain Temple
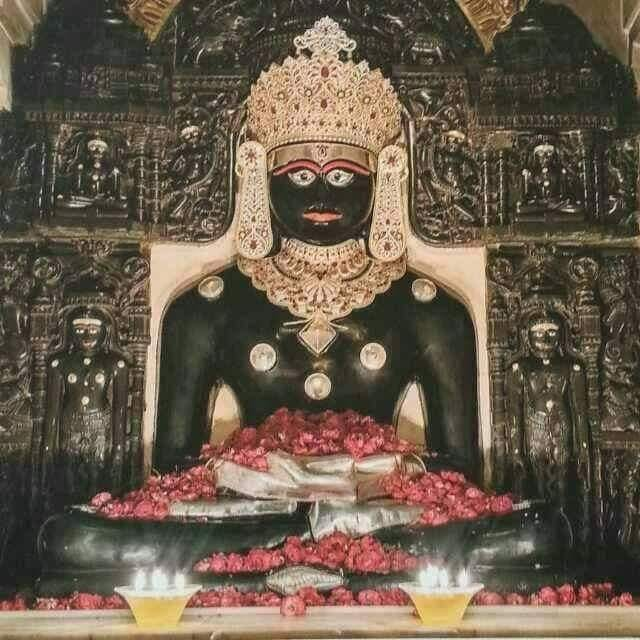
- Neminatha in the temple

- Location of the temple in Gujarat

Religion
- Affiliation: Jainism
- Deity: Neminatha
- Governing body: Anandji Kalyanji Trust
- Status: active

Location
- Location: Girnar Jain temples, Girnar
- Municipality: Junagadh
- State: Gujarat
- Country: India
- Interactive map of Neminath Jain Temple
- Coordinates: 21°31′36″N 70°31′23″E

Architecture
- Type: Jain temple
- Style: Māru-Gurjara architecture
- Creator: Sajjana
- Completed: 1129 CE

Specifications
- Direction of façade: West
- Length: 195 to 190 ft (59 to 58 m)
- Width: 130 ft (40 m)
- Temple: 1
- Shrine: 67+
- Materials: Black-grey granite

Neminath Jain Temple, originally known as Karnavihara, is a Jain temple dedicated to the Jain tirthankara Neminatha. It is on Girnar hill, near the city of Junagadh in Gujarat, India. The temple is the foremost temple among all of the Girnar Jain temples. The oldest part of the present temple was built c. 1129 CE, using Māru-Gurjara architecture. More shrines and idols in the temple have been installed throughout its history.

The central temple has three components, which are the central shrine (mulaprasada), the principal hall (gudhamandapa), and an outer-hall (mandapa). Each of the halls are situated in a large courtyard surrounded by a series of shrine cells along a passage. The courtyard also includes several other shrines to Neminatha.

== History ==
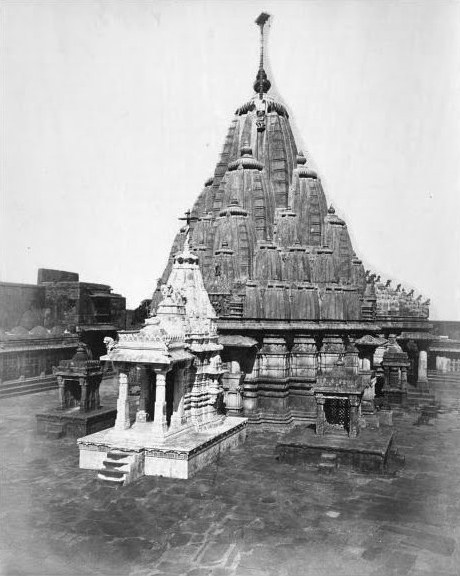
Temple in 1911, from northeast

According to Vividha Tirtha Kalpa written by Jinprabhasuri, there was an ancient wooden temple on the mountain with a clay idol of Neminatha in it. A Śrāvaka named Ratnasar came to Girnar along with a sangha from Kashmir. The sangha performed abhiseka on the idol made of clay and due to the heavy flow the idol melted. A legend has that upset with the incident, Ratnasar fasted for 21 days and upon completion, demi-goddess Ambika gave him a stone idol of Neminatha which Ratnasar got consecrated in the temple on 15th day of bright half of Vaishakh month in Vikram Samvat 980 (10th century CE). Brihadswayambhustotra, a text dated c. 600 CE by Digambara poet Samantabhadra, mentions the existence of footprints of Arishtanemi on Girnar. This led to a temple with an idol to Arishtanemi then being built later on. This was then replaced with the oldest part of the present temple, which was built c. 1129 CE by Sajjana, the governor of Saurashtra under the Solankis of Gurjaratra . This reconstruction was first mentioned by Vijaysensuri. Furthermore, there are several prabandhas mentioning the reconstruction with minute variations. According to Merutunga's Prabandhachintamani, Sajjana opted to use three years worth of revenue income from the Saurashtra region to rebuild the temple, rather than crediting it to the royal treasury. Siddharaja, the king of Gujarat at the time, inquired with regard to the funding mechanism during his return from a pilgrimage to the Somnath temple. Sajjana had told Jains of Vanthali to raise the funding to be ready for his return. When Siddharaja visited the temple, he was told that the temple was named Karnavihara after his father, Karna. This pleased him, causing him to approve the spending. A century ago there was an inscription on the stone near the south gate that mentioned the word Karnayatan, though this is now lost.

Merutunga also mentions that Sajjana had replaced the previously existing wooden temple, however no other work corroborates this. According to Vijaysensuri, the amalasaraka (top of the spire) of the temple was gilded by Bhavad of Malwa around the 12th century. An inscription in the Shanraja-shila-prashasti mentions that Mandalika I, who was king of Chudasama, had the temple gilded with gold plates in c. 1453–1454 CE. Harpal Shah of Khambhat renovated the temple c. 1393 CE on the instruction of Jayatilaksuri of Brihat-Tapa-Gaccha.

== Architecture ==
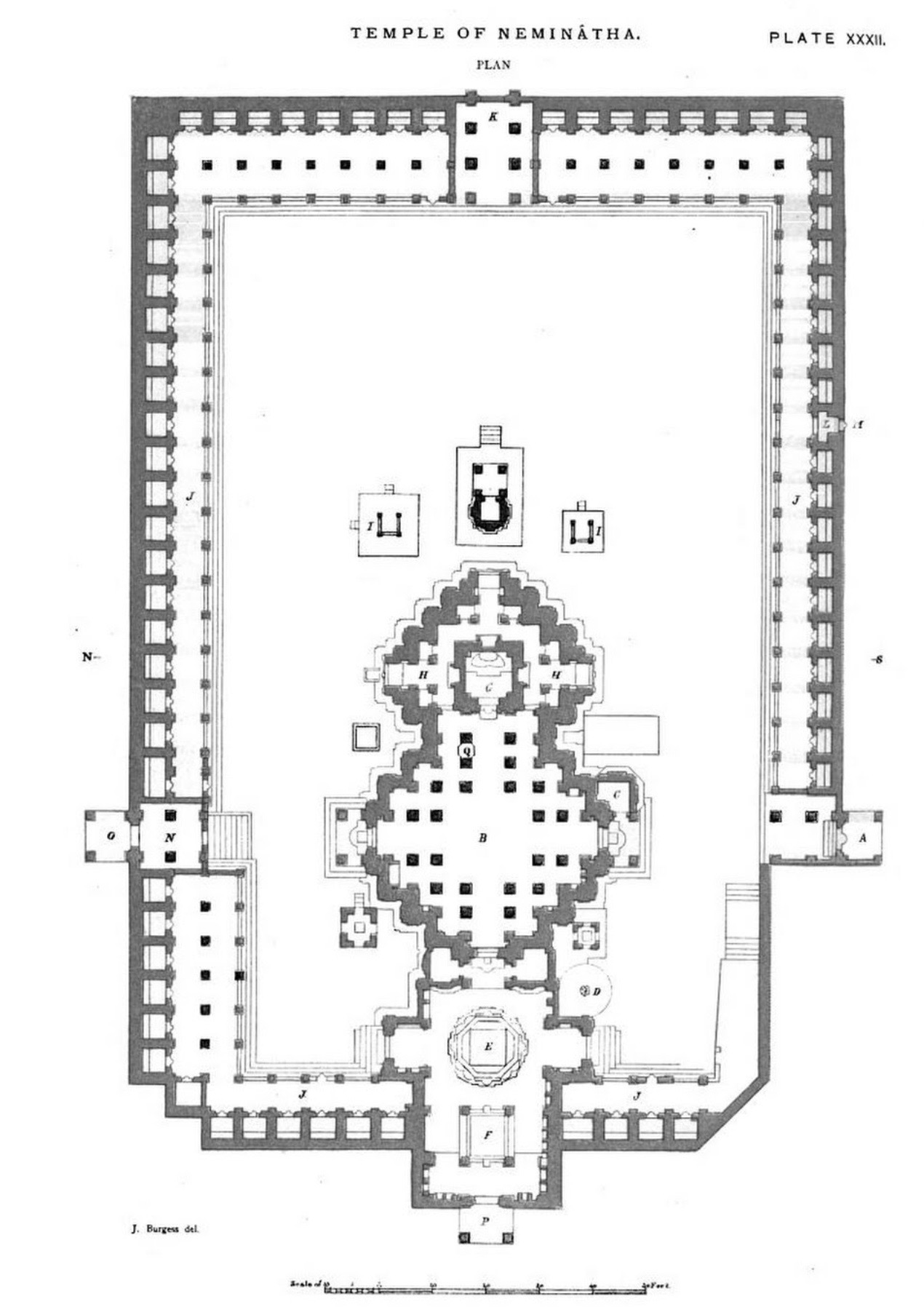
Plan of the temple

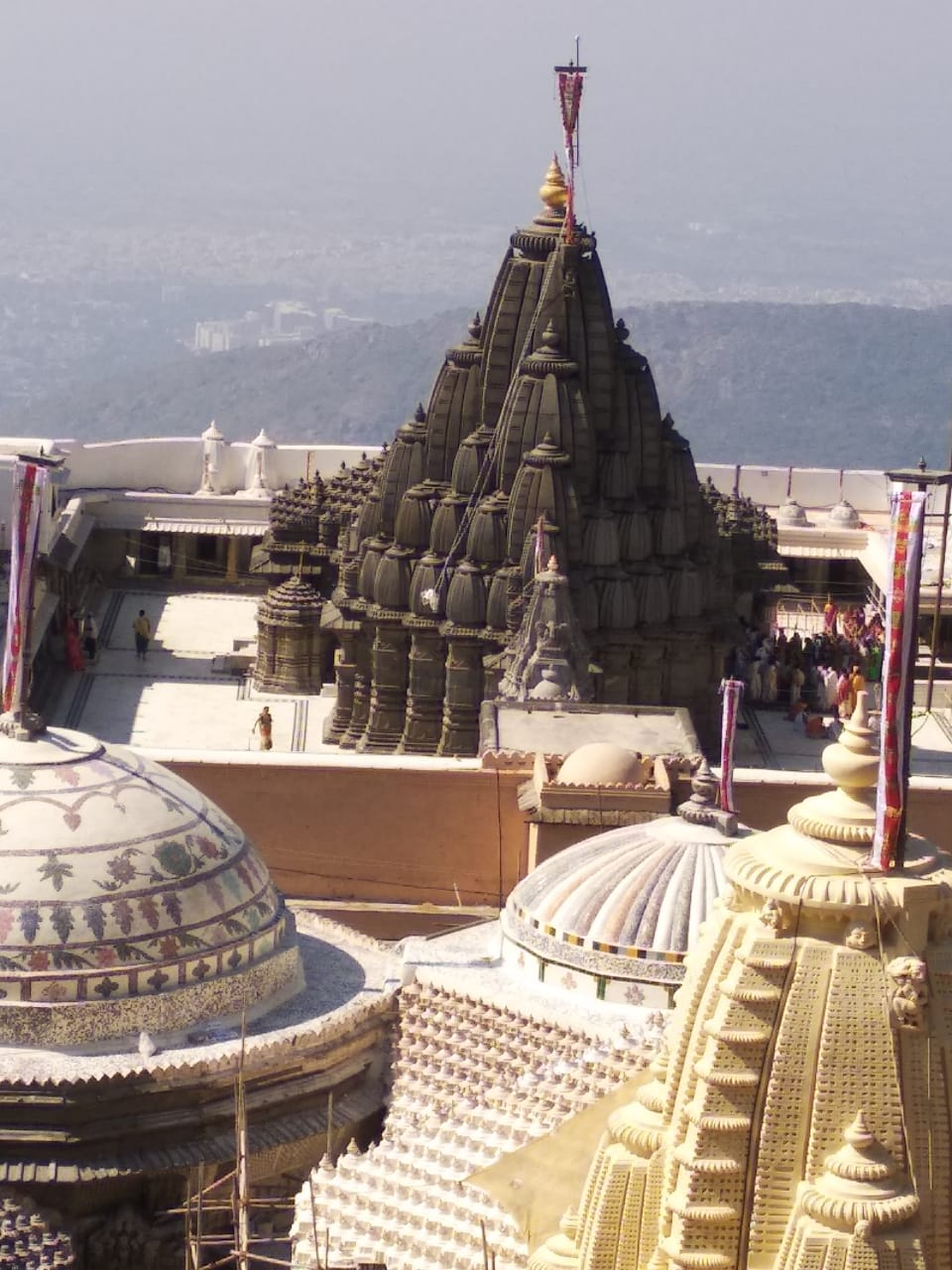
Neminath temple among other Jain temples in the cluster, from east

The central Neminath temple employs Māru-Gurjara architecture (Solaṅkī style). It faces west, and is built from both black and grey granite. The central temple has three components, which are the central shrine (mulaprasada), the inner principal hall (gudhamandapa), and an outer-hall (mandapa)

The central shrine is of sandhara style, the sanctum having a circumambulatory passage (pradakshina) around it. The exterior of the temple is carved, yet only sparsely so. It contains a large black statue of Neminath sitting in the lotus position holding a conch in his palm. The circumambulatory passage has many idols in white marble, including that of a Ganesha and a chovishi or slab of the 24 Tirthankara.

The principal hall that resides in front of the central shrine measures 41' 7" by 44' 7". These measurements are taken from inside the central shrine door to the door leading out at the west end. The roof is supported by 22 square columns of granite that are coated with white lime and covered in marble. There are vestibules in the north and south sides that lead to doors, and there are also vestibules in the east side of the hall which lead to the sanctum. The ceiling, measuring about 15 feet (4.6 m) in diameter, is made of black stone carved into multiple layers. There are 16 idols installed in the ceiling. The exterior of the principal hall is also simple and sparsely carved. The floor is made of tessellated marble. There are niches in the walls of the inner hall that contain idols of Hemachandra, Kumarapala, and Shantisuri of Kunjarapadriya Gaccha, all of which are dated c. 1219 CE. On the pillars of the gudhamandapa are inscriptions dated c. 1278 CE, c. 1280 CE, and c. 1284 CE; all related to various donations. According to Jinharshagani, the toranas still on the three gates of the outer-hall were added by minister Vastupala. Furthermore, there are two other shrines between the principal hall and the outer-hall.

Another mandapa (outer-hall) was installed to the west of the principal hall in the 17th century. This was in replacement of the previously existing outer-hall that was known as pau-mandapa. The mandapa measures 38' x 21' 3". It houses two small platforms that are paved with slabs of yellow stone; These stones are covered with representations of feet in pairs called padukas, which represent the feet of the 420 Ganadharas, who are the first disciples of Tirthankaras. These platforms were installed c. 1628 CE. On the west of the mandapa is a closed west entrance with a porch overhanging the vertical scarp of the hill.

The central temple is the largest temple of the Jain temples on Girnar, standing in a quadrangular paved courtyard that measures 190 to 195 feet (58 to 59 m) in length and 130 feet (40 m) in width. The courtyard is bordered by 67 cells, each of which enshrine a marble idol with a cloister in front of them onto a bench. The principal east entrance was closed in or after the 19th century, and has since been converted into a room where idols were installed. The south and north entrances are located between the series of shrine cells. The passage in front of the shrine cells was built c. 1159 CE according to the inscription in the north entrance. Two pattas are installed in the passage: a nandishwardwipa patta dated c. 1231 CE on the west side, and a samet shikhar patta (identified as vis viharman patta) on the north side.

There is a small temple of Adinatha behind the Neminath temple; This secondary temple faces east, and was built by Jagmal Gordhan of the Porwad family c. 1792 CE under the guidance of Jinendra Suri. Later on, a shrine of the sati Rajimati was built next to it, which remains to this day. There are a few shrines in the courtyard that are dedicated to Jain monks. The shrine dedicated to Ambika near the south porch of the gudhamandapa is a later addition, as it is not mentioned in any of the medieval literature.

On the south side, there is a shrine with a large cellar that has been historically known as Papamadhi. It houses a large white marble idol of Amijhara Parshwanatha, along with idols of Neminath, Rathnemi, and another Neminath installed by Jinchandrasuri of Kharatara Gaccha in c. 1302 CE. The first mention of Amijhara Parshwanatha is found in the 17th century text Tirthamala by Sheelvijay, of Tapa Gaccha. It is not mentioned in any works from the 8th to 16th century.
