= Radha Damodar Temple, Junagadh =

Hindu temple dedicated to Radha Krishna in Junagadh, Gujarat

Shri Radha Damodar Temple
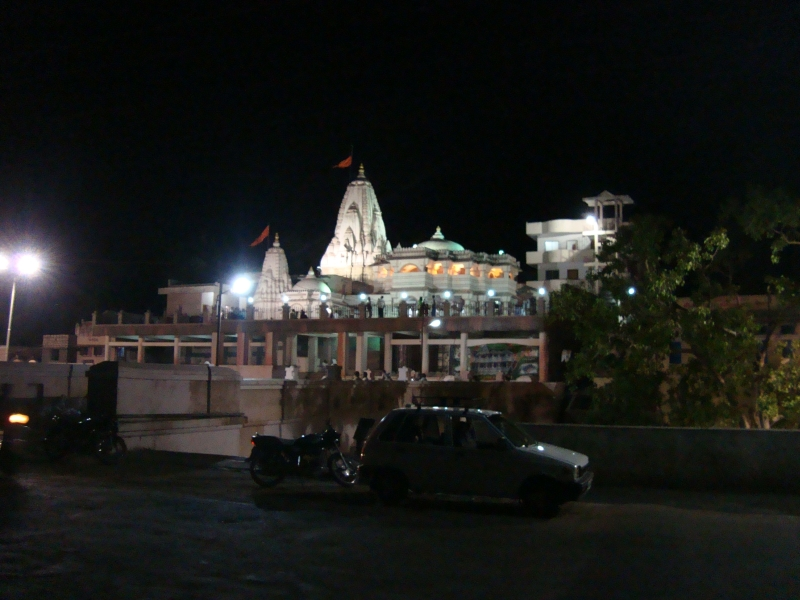
- Shri Radha Damodar temple, Junagadh

- Location in Gujarat

Religion
- Affiliation: Hinduism
- District: Junagadh
- Deity: Radha Krishna; Revati Balrama
- Festivals: Janmashtami, Radhashtami, Holi, Kartik Purnima

Location
- Location: Girnar mountain
- State: Gujarat
- Country: India
- Interactive map of Shri Radha Damodar Temple
- Coordinates: 21.3132°N 70.2910°E

Architecture
- Materials: Pink sandstone

Website
- https://shreeradhadamodarji.org/

Shri Radha Damodar Temple is a Hindu temple, situated in the Junagadh district of Gujarat, India. The temple is dedicated to the Damodar Hari, another name of Hindu god Krishna. In this temple, Damodar is worshiped in his four arms form of Vishnu along with his consort, goddess Radha who is seated next to him in the central shrine. Within the premises of temple, Damodar kund and Revati kund are also present. This temple comes under the special care of the Government of Gujarat.

Shri Damodar Pilgrimage which includes Shri Radha Damodar temple and its popular lakes - Damodar Kund and Revti Kund, is situated along the road to Girnar mountains. The renovation of this pilgrimage was done in the year 462 CE during the regime of king Skand Gupta who belongs to Gupta Empire.

== Structure ==
The main temple is made up of pink sand stone and has two important parts—Nij temple and Saloha Mandap. Peak of Nij temple is 65 feet high and the height of Saloha Mandap’s peak is 30.5 feet. The flag is at the apex of Nij temple. The temple also has 32 arcs and 84 well crafted pillars.

The central shrine of temple is dedicated to Radha and Damodar (Krishna) where Krishna is present in his four hands form of Vishnu holding a conch, discus, mace and lotus in each hand. Adjacent to central shrine, another shrine is present which is dedicated to Lord Balrama and his wife Revati. In the south-west side of the temple there is a temple dedicated Ganesha.

== Significance ==
Shri Radha Damodar temple is one of the ancient temple of Gujarat. It is believed that temple was built by Vajranabh, grandson of Krishna. The temple is crowded with thousands of devotees on special occasions like 15th day of Krishna paksh of Bhadra month for Pitru Tarpan (paying tribute to deceased ancestors). Devotees also take holy bath in sacred Damodar Kund with the belief of getting salvation post life. In the Skand Upanishad, it is described that the Damodar kund rests in the path of river Swarna Rasha. By bathing in this river, people get rid off their sins. The famous devotional poet Narsinh Mehta also used to bath in Damodar Kund everyday before worshiping Damodar (Krishna).

== Festivals ==
=== Janmashtami ===
Vishnu Yagya is performed in this temple on the day of Janmashtami. Vishnu Sahasra is recited in this temple along with Vishnuyag Yajna to relieve the suffering that Lord Vishnu suffered when he descended on earth as Krishna. After that the Krishna Janmotsav (Birth Celebrations) begins with the Abhishak of Shaligramji. Krishna is specially dressed and ornamented. At midnight when the gate of the temple opens, the devotees present cheer aloud with the spirit of Krishna's birth. After the Abhishekam of Shri Krishna, the Matki (Earten Pot) hanged high is broken, in which the youth celebrate the festival by displaying their skills by creation of human pyramid.Butter is placed in the pot which is later given as prasad to the devotees present.

== Gallery ==
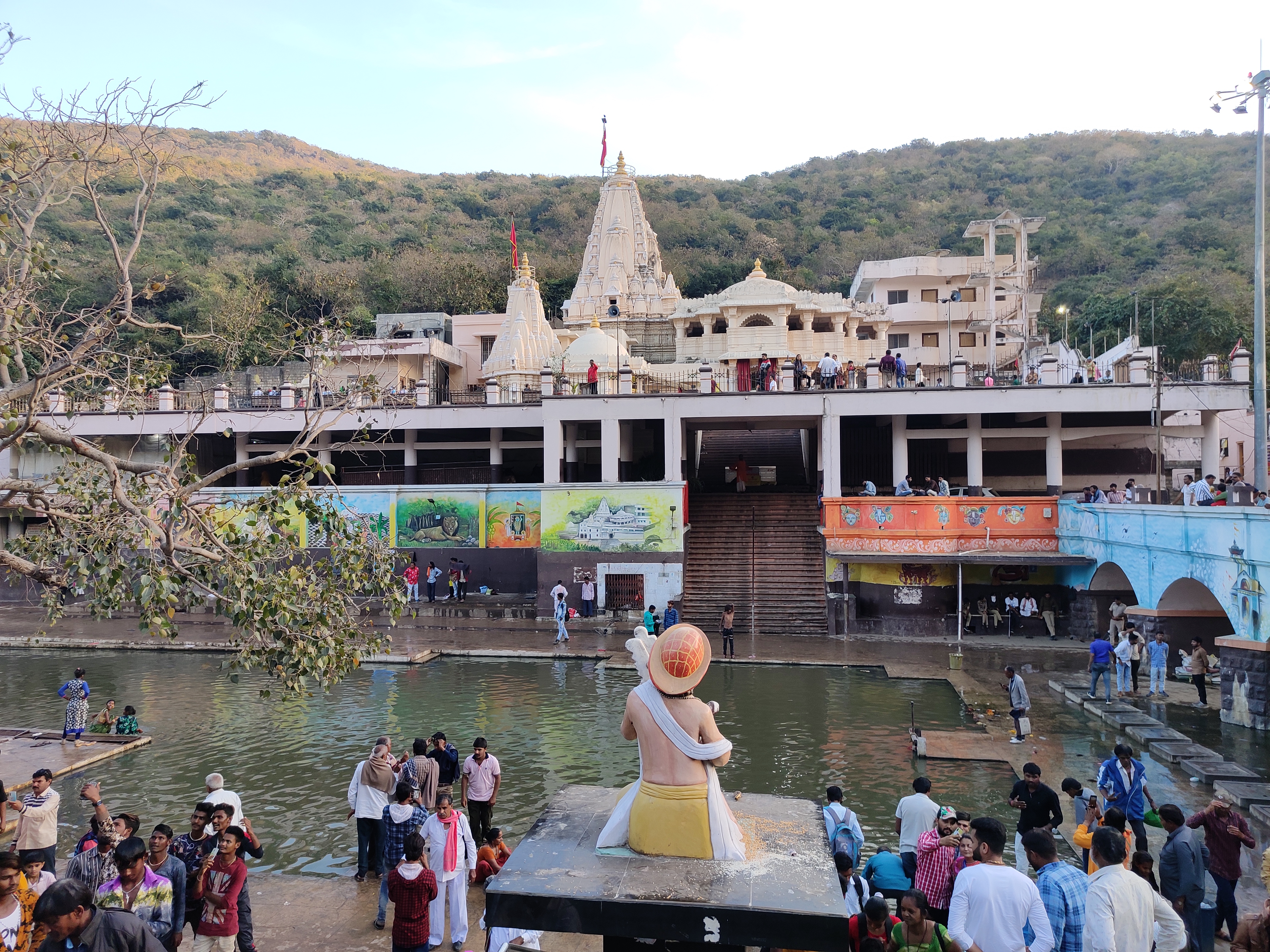
Front view of Radha Damodar Temple

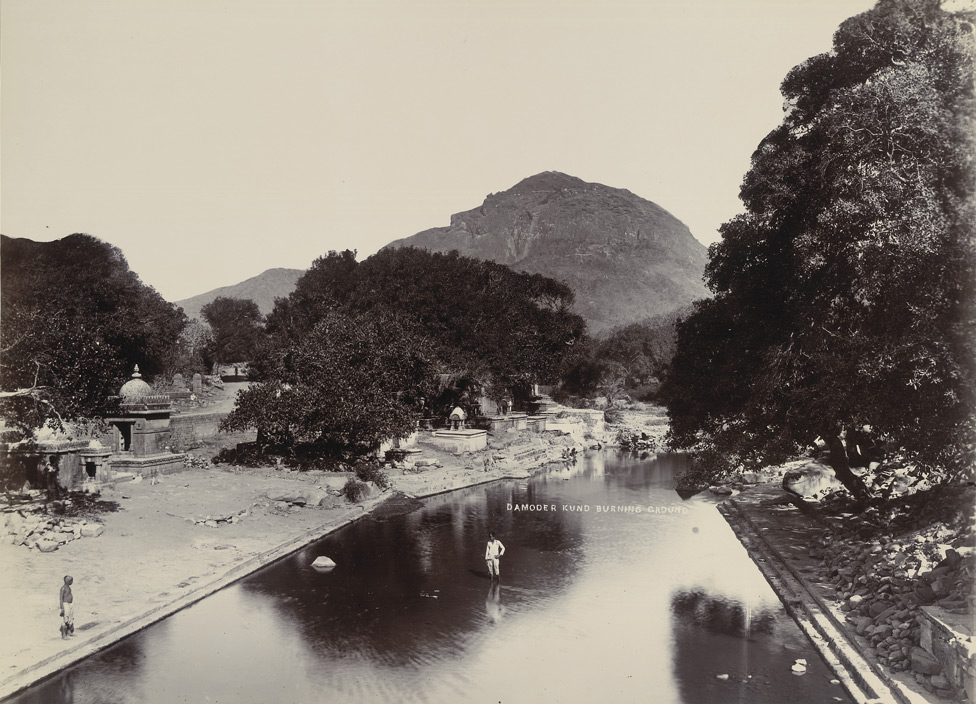
Ghats of Radha Damodar temple

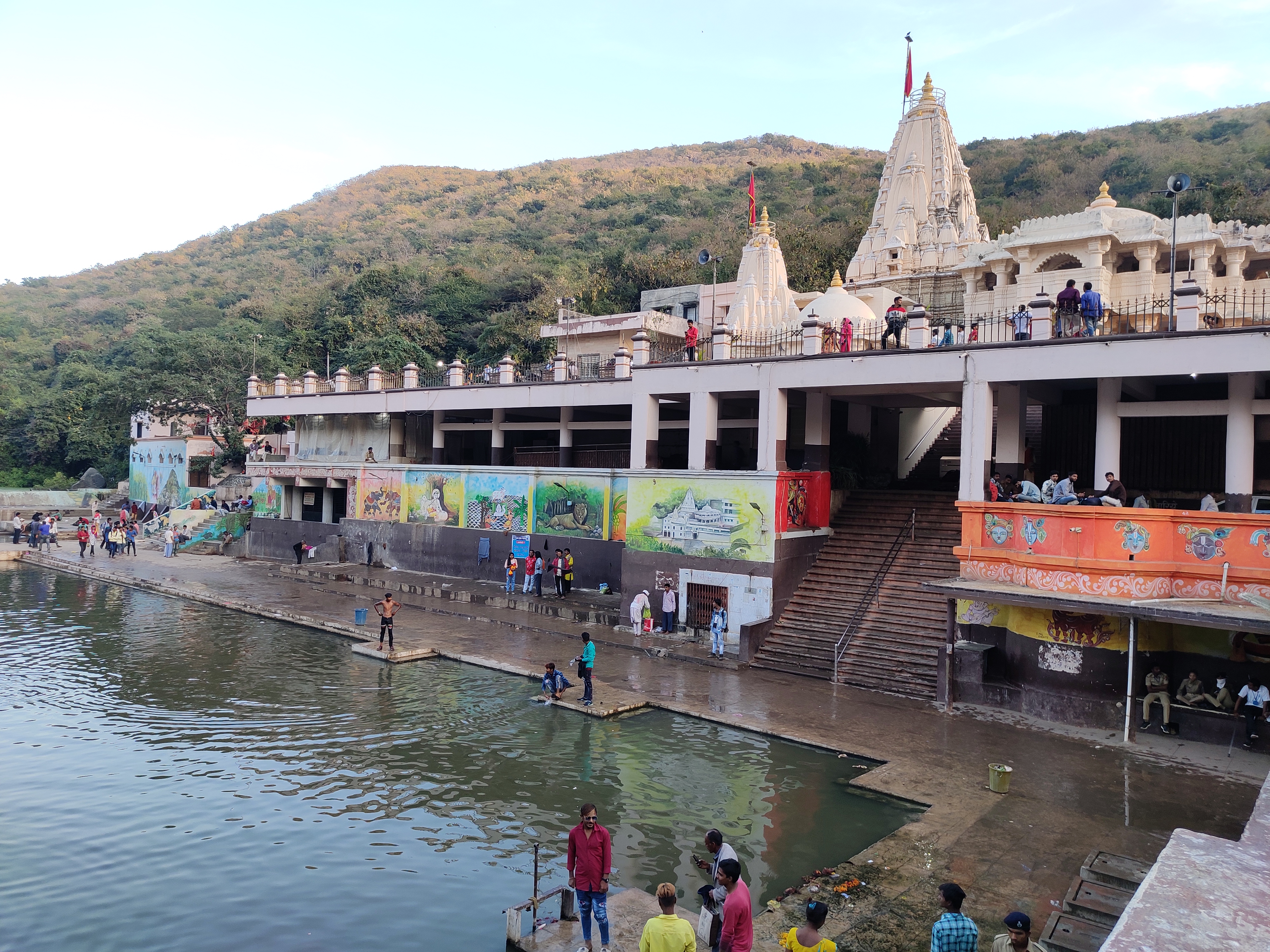
Temple premises

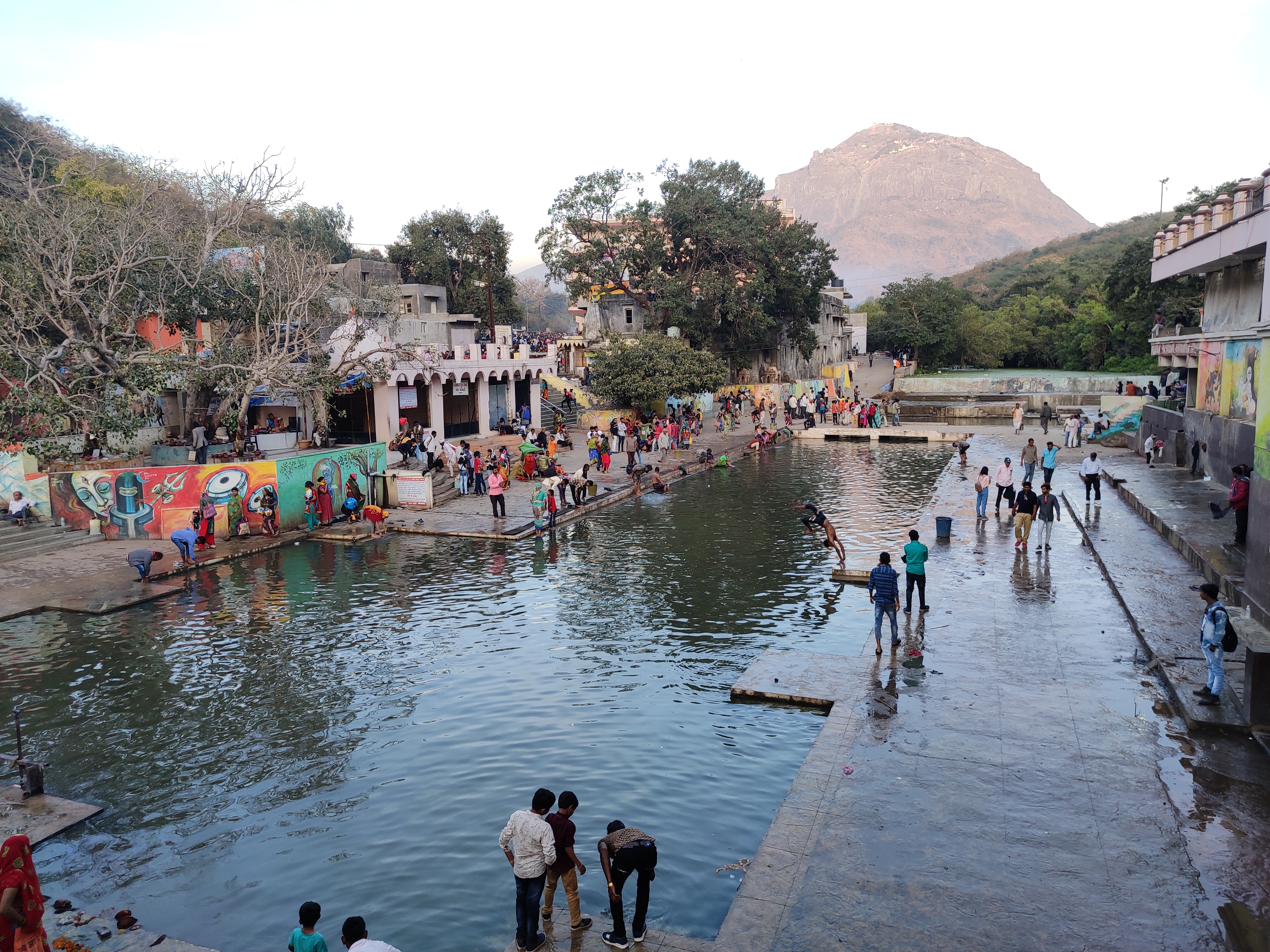
Damodar Kund

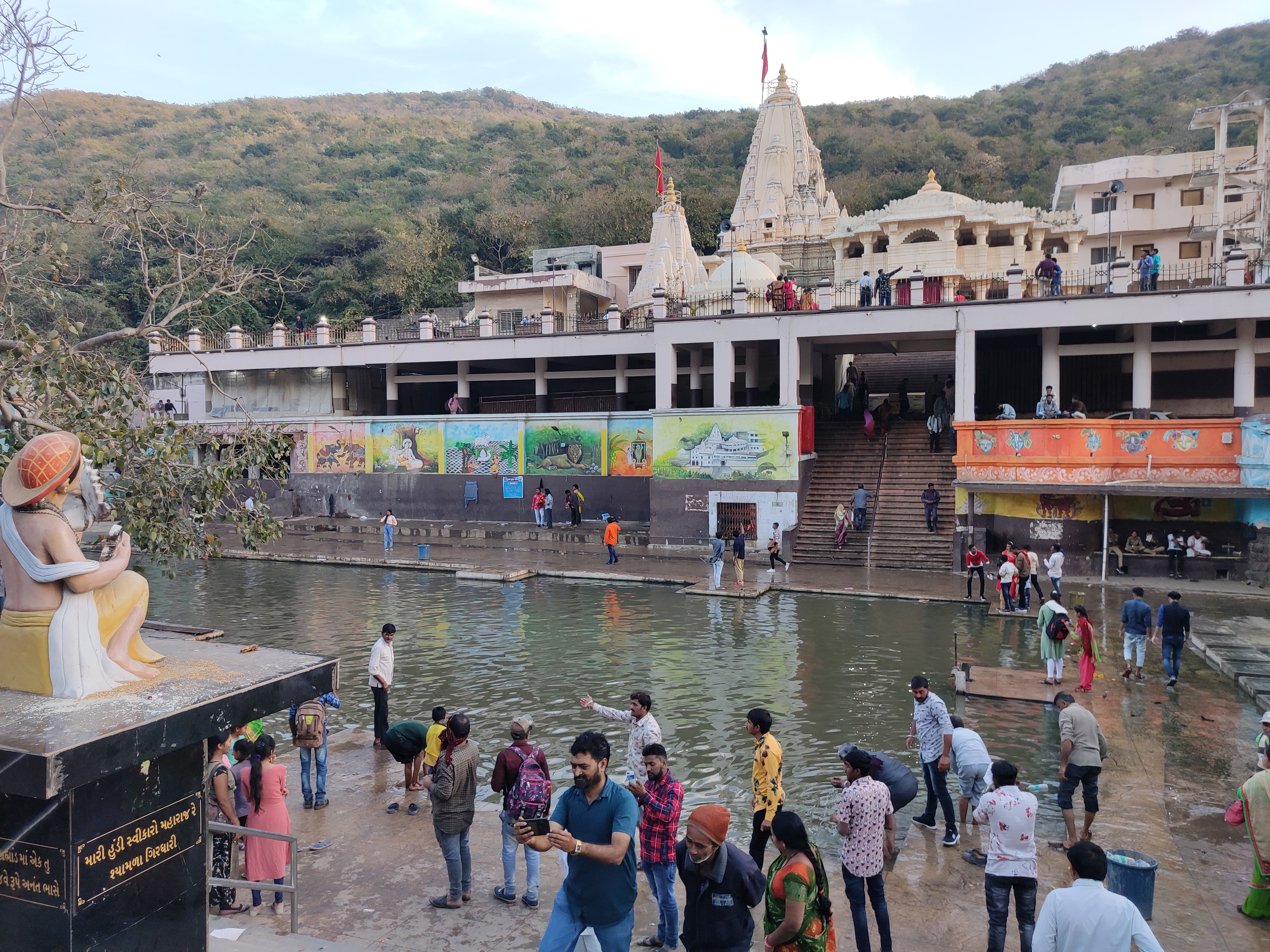
Devotees visiting temple

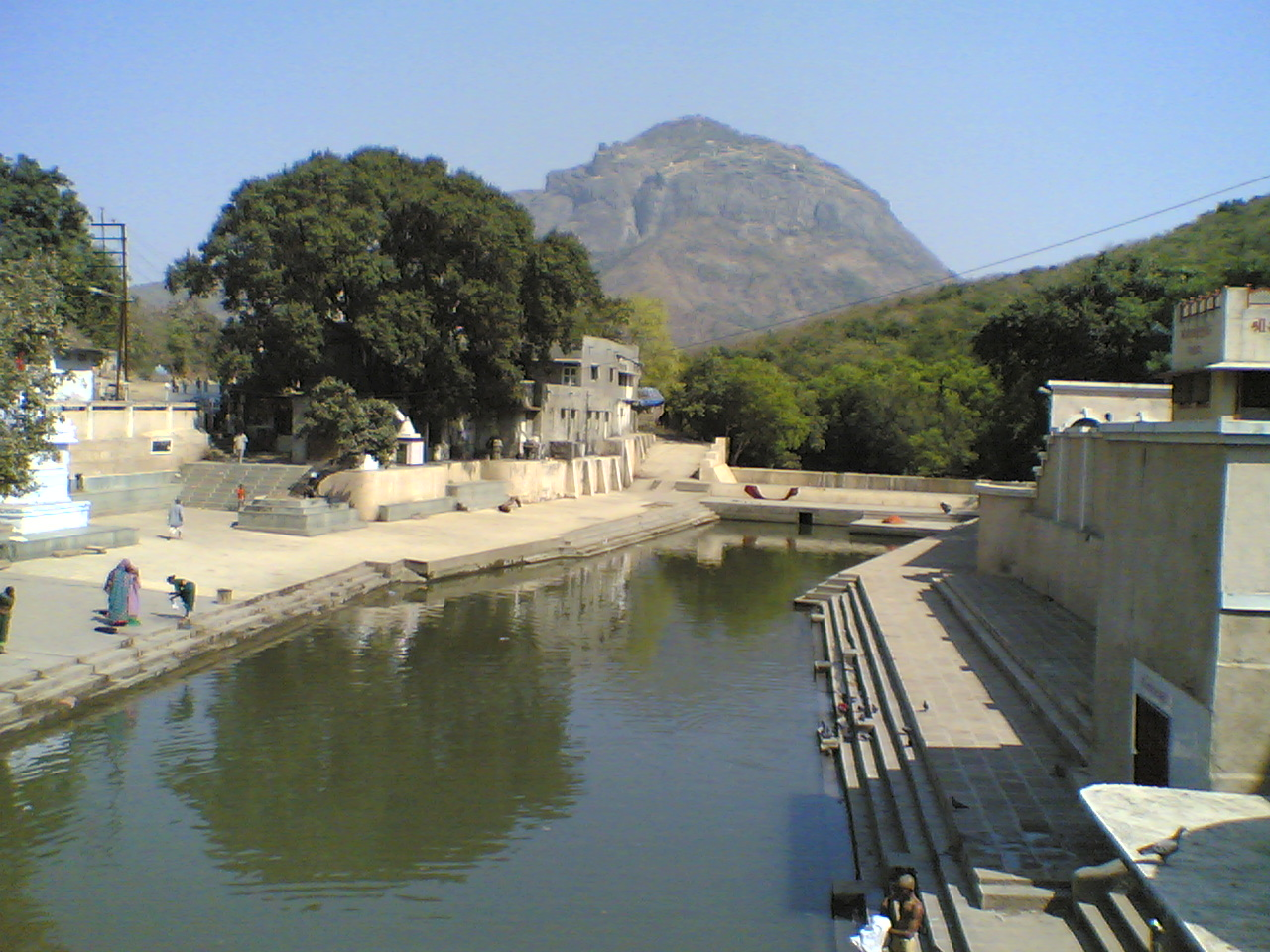
View of Girnar Hills from temple

== See also ==
- Radha Krishna
- Narsinh Mehta
- Damodar Kund
- Dwarkadhish Temple
- Radha Damodar Temple, Vrindavan
