= Damodar Kund =

Lake in Junagadh district, India

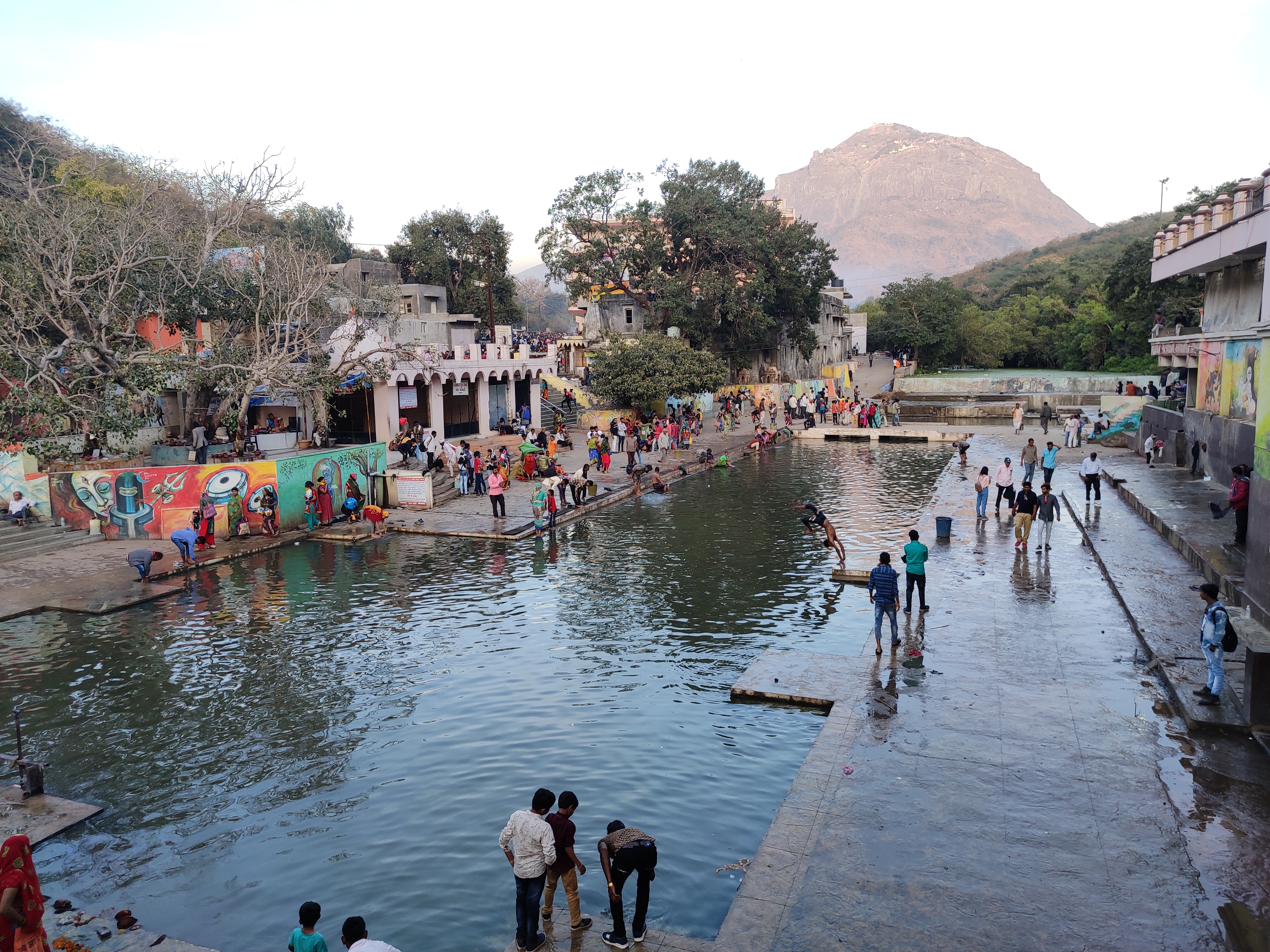
- Damodar Kund at the foothills of Girnar. The Girnar Hills can be seen in the background.

- Location in Gujarat Location in India
- Location: Near the Girnar Hills, Junagadh, Gujarat
- Coordinates: 21°31′32″N 70°29′10″E
- Lake type: Artificial lake
- Basin countries: India
- Max. length: 257 ft (78 m)
- Max. width: 50 ft (15 m)
- Settlements: Junagadh

Damodar Kund, located at the foothills of Girnar hills, near Junagadh in the Indian state of Gujarat, is considered a sacred lake as per Hindu beliefs.

Many Hindus prefer to bathe here and immerse the ashes and the bones left after cremation of dead bodies, here at Damodar Kund due to a belief that the departed souls would get moksha here. It may be mentioned here other such famous places for immersion of ashes and bones (Hindu rite of asthi-visarjana) are in Ganga at Haridwar and Triveni Sangam at Prayag.

The water of the lake has properties of dissolving the bones. The lake is 257 feet (78 m) long and 50 feet (15 m) broad and only 5 feet (1.5 m) deep. It is surrounded by a well built ghat. The steps for going up the Girnar hills start near Damodar Kund.

At the foothills of Ashwatthama Hill in Girnar mountain range base, southerly to Damodara Kund is the Damodar Hari Temple. The idols here are supposed to have been installed by Vajranabha, the grandson of Lord Shri Krishna, the one who also is credited with Dwarkadhish Temple and many other. Historically, these temples are supposed to have been built or renovated by a Suryavanshi ruler named Chandraketpur, who is also accredited to have built the temples of Shiva at Bhavnath, a testament to his tolerance for all belief systems. The place underwent renovation during the regime of King Skand Gupta of Gupta dynasty in the year 462 AD. Lord Damodar here is considered by Vaishnavites as Adhipati of Girnar Kshetra.

Covering an area of 32 acres (13 ha), the temple is constructed using pink sandstone and consists of an inner Nij Mandir and an outer Solaha Mandapa, each topped with a shikhara, supported by an array of around 84 exquisitely carved pillars. The Nij Mandir's shikhara is 65 feet (20 m) tall and the Sabha Mandap's shikhara is 30 feet (9.1 m) tall. The statue of Damodarji is found in the form of Chaturbhuj, each arm holding a conch, discus, mace and lotus, along with Sri Radha Rani. Both the idols are sculpted from black stone and are heavily decorated with gold and silk. There are other sub shrines dedicated to Lord Balarama, Sri Revati and Lord Ganesha. There are several other ancient temples nearby with on and outside temple complex.

Devotees are seen taking a holy dip in the sacred bathing tank, Damodar Kund, before offering prayers at the temple.

The sewa of Shri Damodarji is being performed here in the Samprant-Yug by Vaishnav tradition. Shri Damodarji is the Ishtdev of the Giri Narayan Brahmin community and several other local communities. As per the traditional belief, Giri Narayan community is living here since around 12000 years ago.

The Damodar Kund is closely attached to the life of Narsinh Mehta, the famous 15th century Gujarati poet and devotee of Krishna, who used to come to bathe at Damodar Kund and is said to have written many of his prabhatiyas (morning prayers), in the natural surrounding here at the Damodar lake, at picturesque foothills of Girnar. At present, there is also a temple of Narsinh Mehta, which is built near temple of Damodar, to commemorate the association of this great saint-poet with Damodar Kund and ancient temple of Damodar here. This temple was built in decade of 1890 during reign of Nawab Sir Muhammad Bahadur Khan III at behest of his Diwan Haridas Viharidas Desai, who used to public money by organizing lottery to build the temple and foot steps leading up the mount Girnar.

Narsinh Mehta in one of his verses mentions this fact as quoting self as under:

(Gujarati:

— ગિરિ તળેટી ને કુંડ દામોદર ત્યાં મહેતાજી ના’વા જાય.)

at the foot hills of Girnar, there is Kund (lake) Damodar, where Mehtaji goes for bathe

Close to Damodara Kund, on the westerly to the Damodarji temple is Revati Kund. The kund is 52 feet (16 m) long, 52 feet (16 m) broad and 37 feet (11 m) deep. Because of the depth dip here is not safe for all. Revati, who was the daughter of King Raiwat, took form from the fires of putreshti yagna. It is said that Raivata Kakudmin or simply Kakudmi left Dwarka and moved to Girnar Hill after Revati was married to Lord Balarama. Hence, mount Girnar was also known as Raivatachal, Raivatgiri, Revatak Parvat or simply Raivata. And Junagadh was also referred to similarly. Baithakji of MahaPrabhuji is located close to Revati Kund. The founder of Pushti Sampradaya Shrimad Vallabhacharayaji (MahaPrabhuji) once visited Damodar pilgrim, where he remitted the shrimad Bhagwat. This is 64th seat of Shri Mahaprabhuji. Close to Revati kund is another mythological place, cave of Muchukunda. The cave has a temple of Lord Krishna, and a Shiv Linga established either by Lord Krishna himself or by Muchkundh. This is the place where Kalayavan, the great Yavana or Greek warrior king, who was chasing Lord Krishna was killed by Muchukunda's gaze in the Indian epic Mahābhārata.

There is another holy lake, Mrigi Kund located nearby in Bhavnath temple premises. Hindus prefer to bathe in all these lakes to get rid of their sins.

Damodar Kund is one of the monuments protected by the state government of Gujarat. It is a temporary check-dam reservoir, which are being made and shifted regularly, in order to maintain water levels throughout the year at Damodar Kund. There are changing rooms, public toilet and other basic amenities provided by government, who have built permanent structure at Damodar Kund for facility of pilgrims.
