= Girnar =

Mountain & Jain Pilgrimage in Gujarat

Girnar Mount
- Revatak Parvata
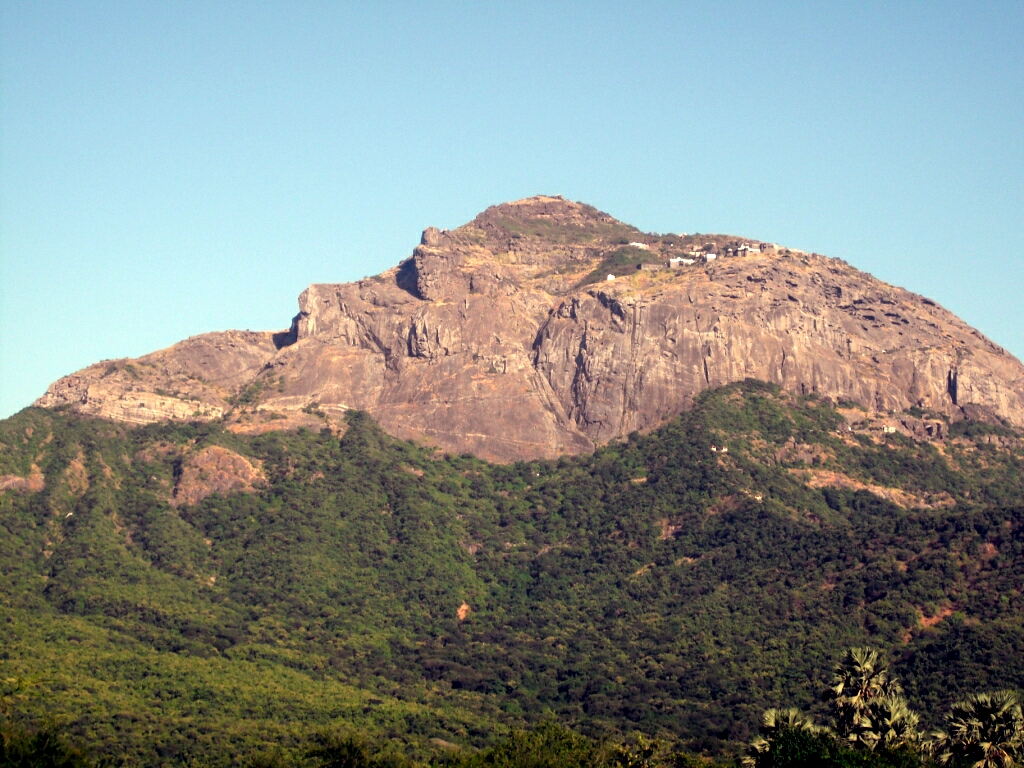
- Mount Girnar

Highest point
- Elevation: 1,145 m (3,757 ft)
- Prominence: 1,130 m (3,710 ft)
- Listing: List of Indian states and territories by highest point, Ribu
- Coordinates: 21°29′41″N 70°30′20″E

Geography
- Location within India Location within Gujarat
- Location: Junagadh, Gujarat

Geology
- Mountain type: Igneous

Girnar is a hill in Junagadh, Gujarat, India. It is a pilgrimage site for Jains, a Mahatirth, where Neminath, the 22nd Tirthaṅkar, is believed to have attained omniscience, and later nirvana, at its highest peak (Neminath Shikhar), along with other five hundred and thirty three enlightened sages. This is according to Kalpa Sūtra written by acharya Bhadrabāhu and Shri Uttaradhyayana Sutra by Arya Sudharmaswami. It is administered by the Junagadh Municipal Corporation.

== Geology ==
Mount Girnar is a major igneous plutonic complex which intruded into the basalts towards the close of the Deccan Trap period. The rock types identified in this complex are gabbros (tholeiitic and alkalic), diorites, lamprophyres, alkali-syenites and rhyolites. The parent gabbroic magma is shown to have given rise in sequence to diorites, lamprophyres and alkali-syenites. The rhyolite, though previously considered as a product of differentiation, is now believed to be an independent magma without any genetic link with the gabbro and its variants.

== History ==
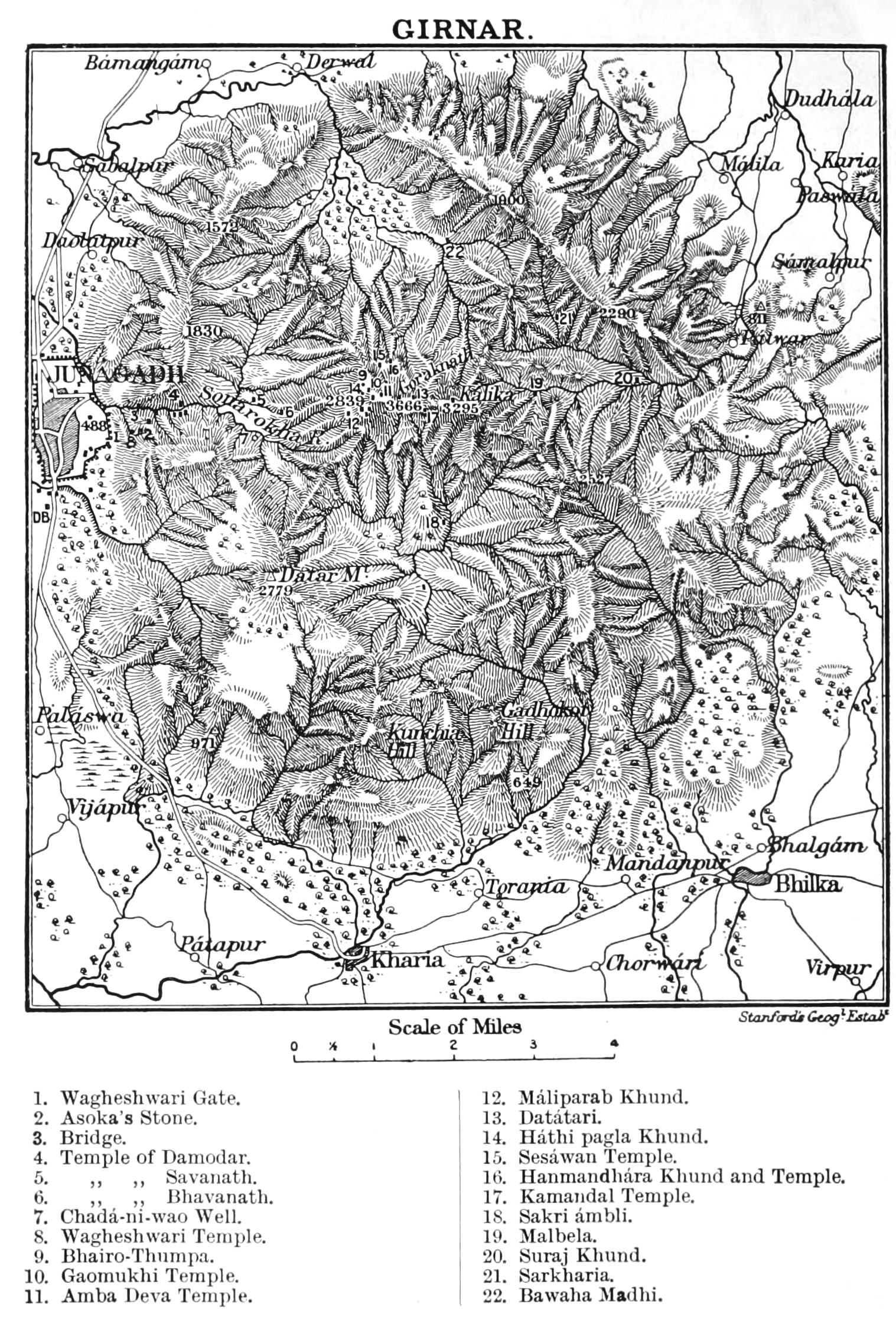
Map of Girnar Mountain Range

Girnar was an important mountain that has been a sacred place for Jains since centuries.

In the 7th century, the Chinese traveler Hsuan-tsang mentioned Girnar as a place of "supernatural monks". On the southern side of the mountain, there are Jain temples that were built in the 13th century.

=== Ashoka edicts ===
Fourteen of Ashoka's Major Rock Edicts, dating to circa 250 BCE, are inscribed on a large boulder that is housed in a small building located outside the town of Junagadh on Saurashtra peninsula in the state of Gujarat, India. It is located on Girnar Taleti road, at about 2 km (1.2 mi) far from Uperkot Fort easterly, some 2 km before Girnar Taleti. An uneven rock, with a circumference of seven meters and a height of ten meters, bears inscriptions etched with an iron pen in Brahmi script in a language similar to Pali and date back to 250 BCE, thus marking the beginning of written history of Junagadh.

On the same rock there are inscriptions in Sanskrit added around 150 CE by Mahakshatrap Rudradaman I, the Saka (Scythian) ruler of Malwa, a member of the Western Satraps dynasty (see Junagadh rock inscription of Rudradaman). The edict also narrates the story of Sudarshan Lake which was built or renovated by Rudradaman I, and the heavy rain and storm due to which it had broken.

Another inscription dates from about 450 CE and refers to Skandagupta, one of the last Gupta emperors.

The protective building around the edicts was built in 1900 by Nawab Rasool Khan of Junagadh State at a cost of Rs 8,662. It was repaired and restored in 1939 and 1941 by the rulers of Junagadh. The wall of the structure had collapsed in 2014.

A much smaller replica of these Girnar edicts has been positioned outside the entrance of the National Museum in Delhi.

Similarly, inside the Parliament Museum at New Delhi, an exhibit replicates the act of artists sculpting inscriptions of Girnar edict on a rock.

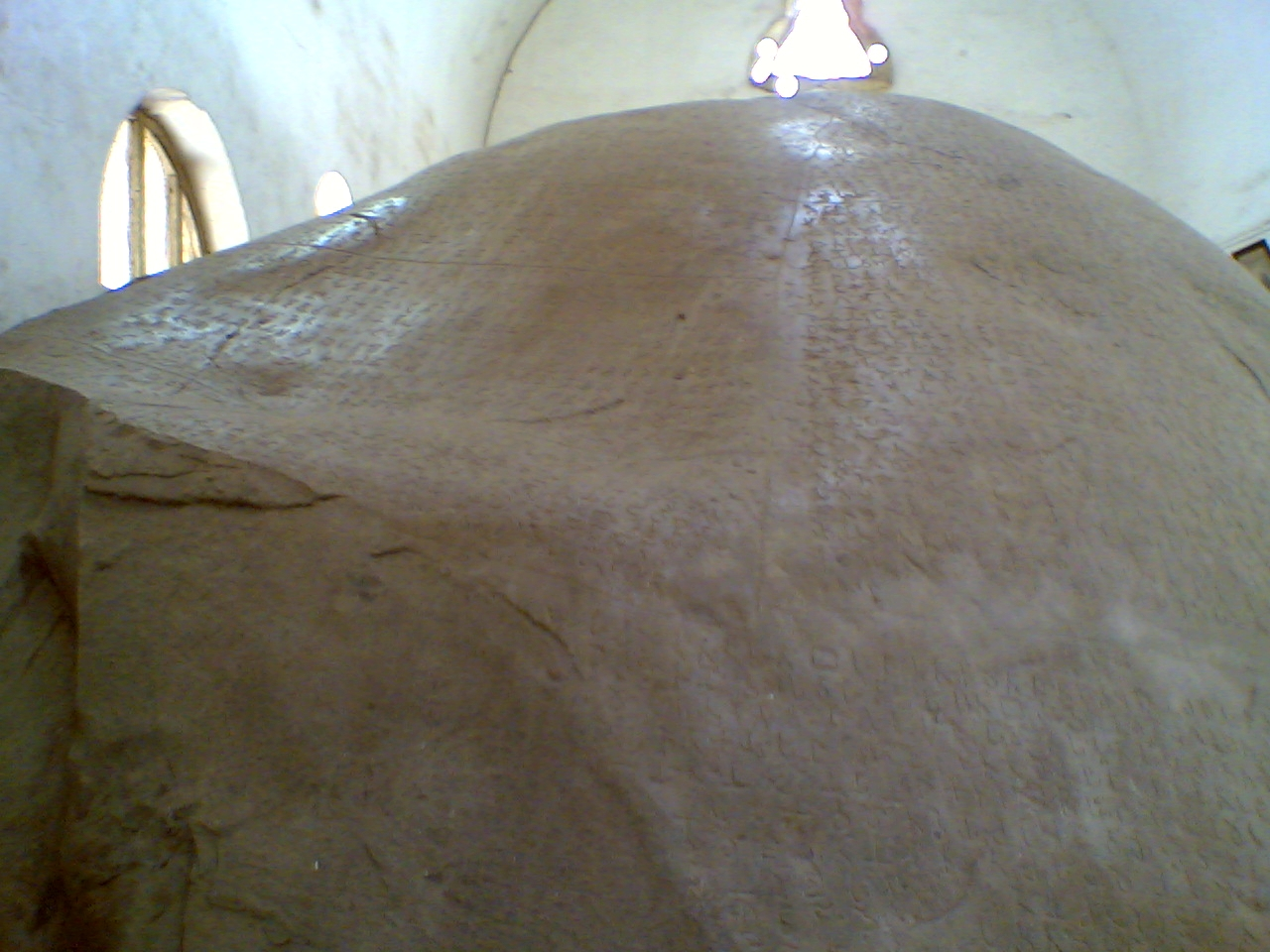
Ashoka's Rock Edict

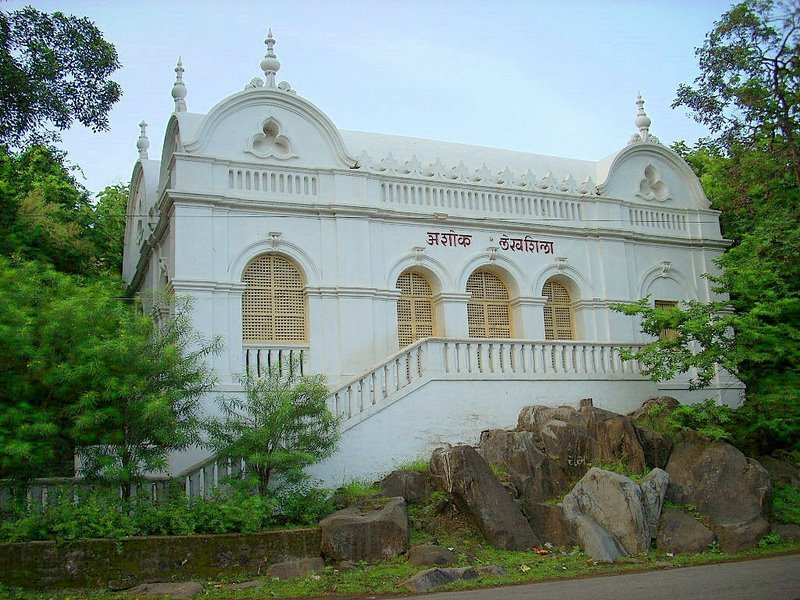
Housing for Ashoka's edicts.

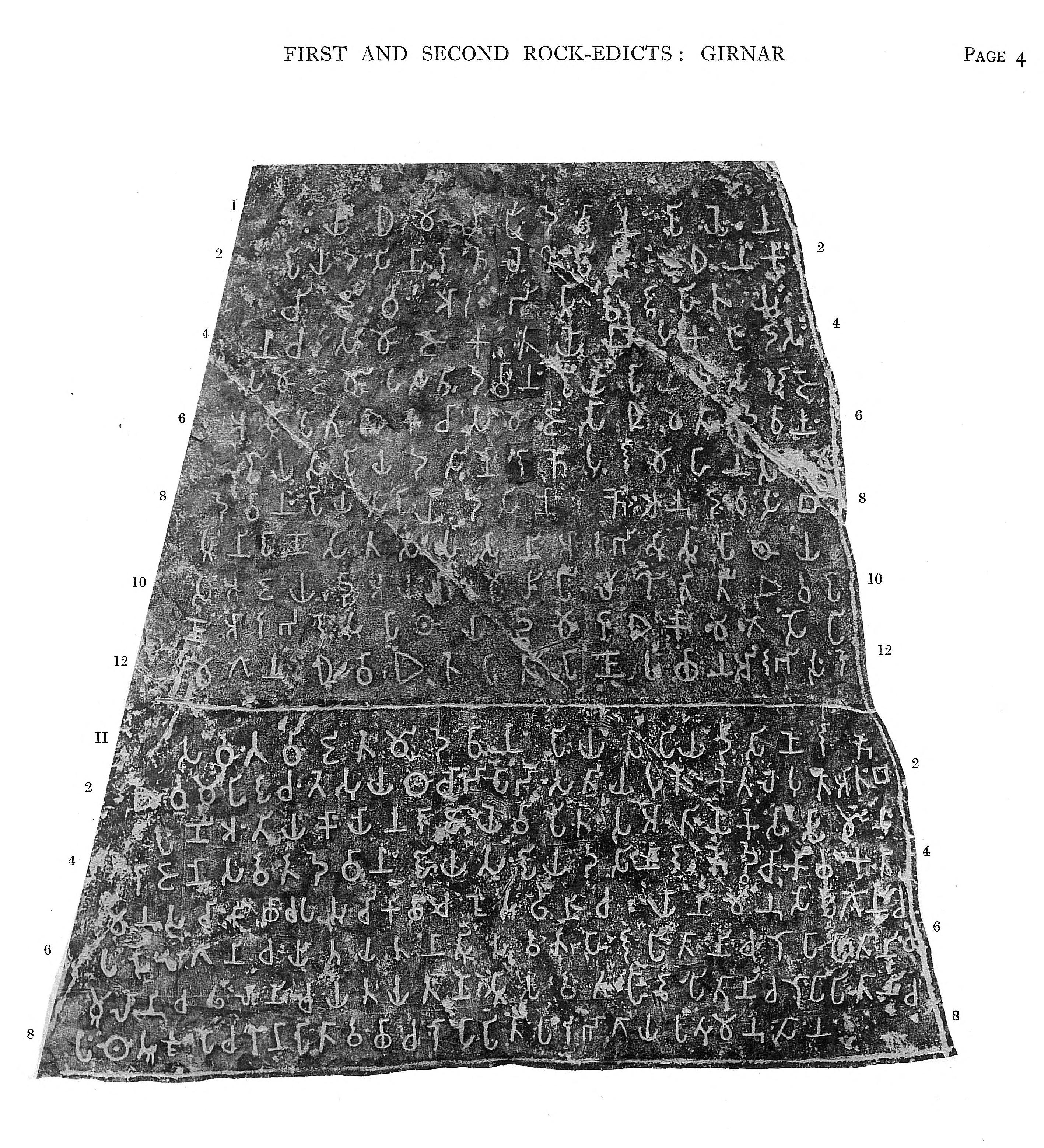
Estampage of a part of the inscriptions.

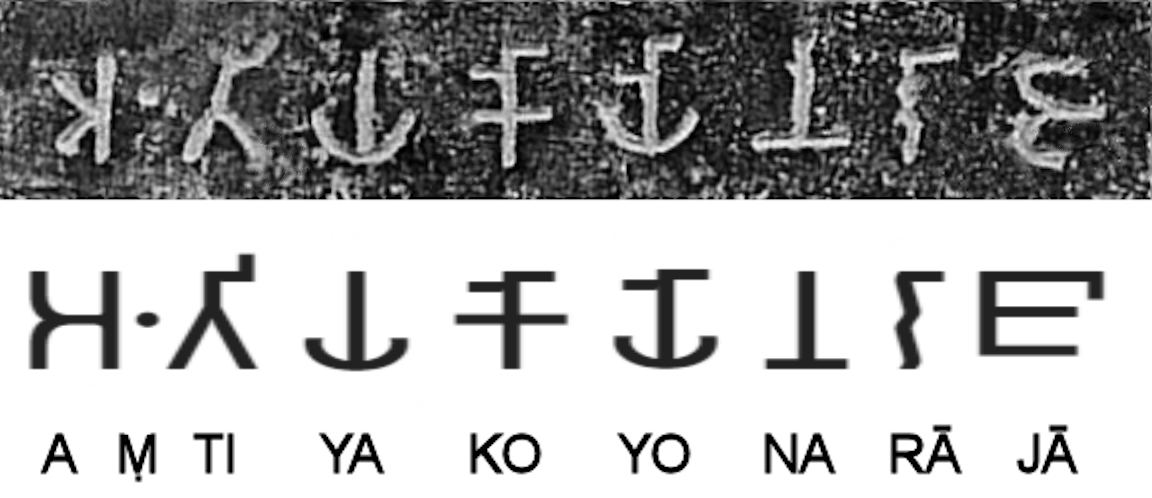
"Aṃtiyako Yona Rājā" (𑀅𑀁𑀢𑀺𑀬𑀓𑁄𑀬𑁄𑀦𑀭𑀸𑀚𑀸, "The Greek king Antiochos"), mentioned in Major Rock Edict No.2, at Girnar.

A little further from Ashoka's inscription, on the right side of the road, there is a large stone standing which looks like exact replica of Ashoka's inscription.

=== Jain sources ===
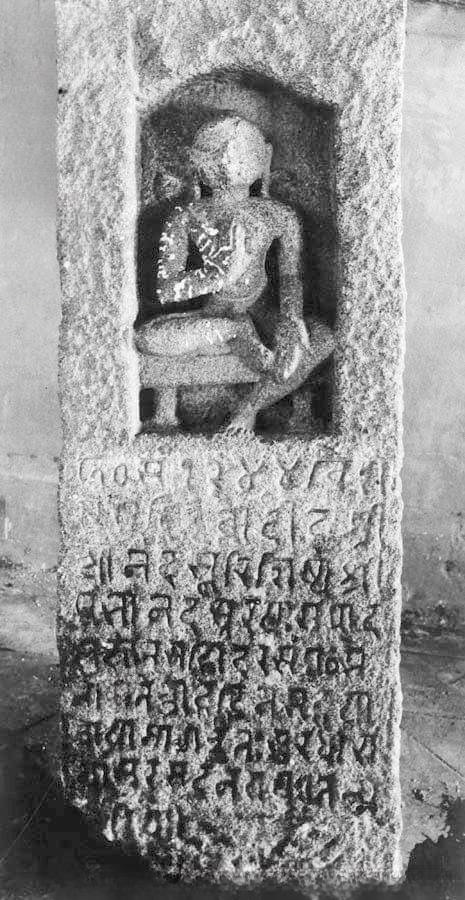
A carving of Jain monk, and inscription from 1188 CE at Girnar

Jain texts record Girnar mountain as an ancient pilgrimage site from where crores (koda-kodi) of monks have attained liberation. Neminath, the 22nd Tirthankara attained Moksha from this hill. Śvetāmbara tradition also considers Girnar to be an eternally Jain pilgrimage. 3rd century BCE text Kalpa Sūtra by Acharya Bhadrabāhusuri mentions Girnar hill to be the place of initiation, Kevala jnana, and Moksha of the 22nd Tirthankara, Neminatha.

Sixth century BCE Jain text Uttaradhyayana Sutra which is believed to be the direct words of Mahavira, mentions that Neminatha ascended Mount Raivataka to become an ascetic in the 22nd chapter. Acharya Dharasena, who was a resident of Girnar, practiced penance and meditation in Candragumpha cave of the mountain. He gave the spiritual knowledge to Pushpadanta and Bhutabali, who wrote the Shatkhandagama in between 86 CE and 156 CE.

Neminath Temple on Girnar's highest peak (Neminath Shikhar), in 1964, before its allegedly illegal conversion to Dattatreya Temple.	A Jain pilgrim reads scriptures in the Neminath temple, sitting before the foot idol of Neminatha with a full ancient idol carved in padmasana posture behind it, prior to the temple's allegedly illegal conversion into the Dattatreya Hindu temple.

=== Jaina Inscriptions ===
Of the several Jaina inscriptions found at Girnar, most are at the Girnar Jain temples.

1. An inscription is present on a slab over the West entrance of the Vastupāla-Tejaḥpāla Jaina temple. As per the dates in the inscription, it was written in 1230 CE. It extols Neminātha, Vastupāla, Ācārya Haribhadrasūri, Ācārya Vijayasenasūri, and some other Śvetāmbara Jaina monks.
2. On the West door of Vastupāla's temple, another inscription, similar to the one on the slab over the gate, exists. According to the inscription, the Vastupāla-Tejaḥpāla temple was consecrated by Śvetāmbara Jaina monks Ācārya Vijayasenasūri and Ācārya Ānandasūri. It was also written in 1230 CE.
3. On the North door of the Vastupāla-Tejaḥpāla temple, an inscription, similar to the one on the West door of the temple, exists. It begins with extolling the qualities of Neminātha. It goes on to praise Śvetāmbara Jaina monks and Vastupāla. Ṭhākura Someśvaradeva, the author of this inscription, extols Vastupāla in a series of Sanskrit ślokas.
4. An inscription on the East door of the Vastupāla-Tejaḥpāla temple begins by extolling the qualities of Neminātha. Similar to the inscriptions on the other walls and doors of the temple, it also praises Śvetāmbara Jaina monks and Vastupāla. It also states a series of Sanskrit ślokas written by Ācārya Narendrasūri Maladhārī about Vastupāla.
5. An inscription was also found on another East door of the Vastupāla-Tejaḥpāla temple. It is said that the inscription was on a state that was deteriorating from effects of climate. Therefore, some characters were obscure and obliterated. It mentions several popular Jaina images installed by Vastupāla. It also mentions a Jaina image of Saraswati installed by him in Kaśmīra. Several Sanskrit ślokas praising both Vastupāla and Tejaḥpāla are found in this inscription. Additionally, it also mentions the ancestors of Vastupāla and Tejaḥpāla. The name of the author of these verses is mentioned to be Ācārya Saracandrasūri Maladhārī. The name of the copyist is mentioned to be Jaitrasiṃha and the name of the engraver is mentioned to be Kumārasiṃha.
6. The South gate of the temple built by Vastupāla and Tejaḥpāla features an inscription, also written on the same day as the inscriptions on the other walls of the temple. It starts with praises of all the Tirthankaras. Later, it mentions the family of Vastupāla and Tejaḥpāla and their works of philanthropy and religious activities and construction of various Jaina temples. It also mentions Ācārya Vijayasenasūri and Ācārya Ānandasūri as the monks who consecrated the temple. A series of Sanskrit ślokas praising Vastupāla and Tejaḥpāla were written by Ācārya Udayaprabhasūri of the Nāgendra Gaccha. The name of the copyist is mentioned to be Jaitrasiṃha and the name of the engraver is mentioned to be Kumārasiṃha.
7. An incomplete inscription on a wall near the first entrance to the Neminātha Jaina Temple exists. While the first few lines are broken away, it begins by extolling Neminātha, the principal deity of the shrine. Then, it praises demi-goddess Ambika and describes her appearance and iconography as per Jaina traditions. It further describes Yādava kings who maintained this temple. It lists several prominent kings of the region who belonged to the same family.
8. A partially obliterated inscription was found on a wall of a temple facing South on the way that leads to Haṭhīpagalā. It describes the family of Kumārasiṃha and other ministers in the court of the king of the region. It further mentions a pilgrimage to Pālītāṇā temples. The name of the author of this inscription is mentioned to be Ācārya Jayasiṃhasūri. Ṭhākura Haripāla is mentioned to be the engraver of the inscription.
9. The North entrance to the Neminātha Jaina Temple has two pillars, both with different inscriptions. The one on the East side contains an inscription that dates to 1288 CE and mentions the use of 3,050 flowers for the daily worship of Neminātha, the principal deity of the shrine, by Punasiṃha, a Porwāla Jaina and his wife Gunasiri. It further mentions the pilgrimage of Girnar by Vilhaṇata, a Śrīmālī Jaina, in 1277 CE.
10. The inscription on the adjoining pillar at the North entrance to Neminātha Jaina Temple mentions the 1275 CE and is instructional in nature. It mentions the donation of 200 gold coins by merchant Haripāla. It further mentions the instruction to use 2,000 flowers obtained from a dedicated garden for the daily worship of Neminātha. The flowers may not be used for any other purpose than worship. This instruction was given out by Ācārya Jinaprabodhasūri.
11. On the wall of a small shrine towards West of the South entrance to Neminātha Jaina Temple exists a short inscription that begins by paying obeisance to Neminātha and proceeds to appreciate king Mahīpāla and several other people who enabled the construction of a temple of Neminātha.
12. On a broken pillar at the same place, and inscription mentioning a family paying obeisance at the feet of Neminātha in 1428 CE.
13. On a wall to the East of the South entrance to the Neminātha Jaina Temple, an inscription mentioning a pilgrimage to Girnar performed by some wealthy merchants following Kharatara Gaccha in 1488 CE, exists.
14. On the Eastern wall near the North entrance to the Neminātha Jaina Temple, exists an inscription that praises Ācārya Dhaneśvarasūri and his pupils as well as mentions that they performed several religious activities atop the mountain including consecration of idols and temples. It also praises Ācārya Candrasūri for answering questions asked to him by a minister.
15. On the North entrance of the temple, an inscription stating the date of construction of the passage in front of the shrines as 1159 CE, exists.
16. As per the inscription on the wall of a small shrine of Rishabhanatha, it was built by Jagamāl Gordhan, a Porwāla Jaina, in 1792 CE and the idol was consecrated by Ācārya Jinendrasūri.
17. An inscription on the Western wall near the North entrance to the Neminātha Jaina Temple mentions the installation of several Jaina images with a permission from Saṅghavī Ṭhākura Śālivāhana. It also mentions the erection of an idol of Ambika, the attendant deity to Neminātha.
18. Another inscription to the North of the previous inscription mentions the installation of the feet of Neminātha by Jayasiṃhadeva Vijaya. The name of the mason is mentioned to be Vikrama Māruti.
19. An inscription under the image of Pārśvanātha in the temple built by Vastupāla and Tejaḥpāla states that it was installed in 1247 CE and mentions the names of the monks who consecrated it and the lay followers who inspired the installation of the idol.
20. A short inscription was also found in a sacred place known as Hāthipagalā (transl. Elephant's foot). The inscription states that the old road to the top of the mountain was repaired by Mānsiṃhaji Meghāji, a Śrīmālī Jaina by, in the year 1626 CE.
21. A sculpture of the 24 Tirthankaras in a dilapidated temple contains an inscription which states the names of some members of the Pallivāla community and that the sculpture was installed in the year 1292 CE.
22. An inscription written in 1232 CE on the East wall of the path from Rājula's cave to Gaumukha states that Vastupāla built four temples, one each dedicated to himself at Palitana temples, his wife Lalitādevi at Girnar Jain temples, and his wife Sokhukādevi at Aṣṭāpada. The fourth temple he built was of the Kapardīyakśa at Girnar. The inscription further states that he built all these temples with his own money.
23. An inscription that states that Thathīrapāla dedicated an idol of Ṛṣabhanātha to Līlādevi in 1313 CE.
24. Another inscription found states that Tejalā, the wife of Padama, a famous member of the Pallivāla community, caused an idol of Munisuvrata among a group of several idols to be installed in 1299 CE, dedicating it to her grandfather.

== Girnar Ropeway ==
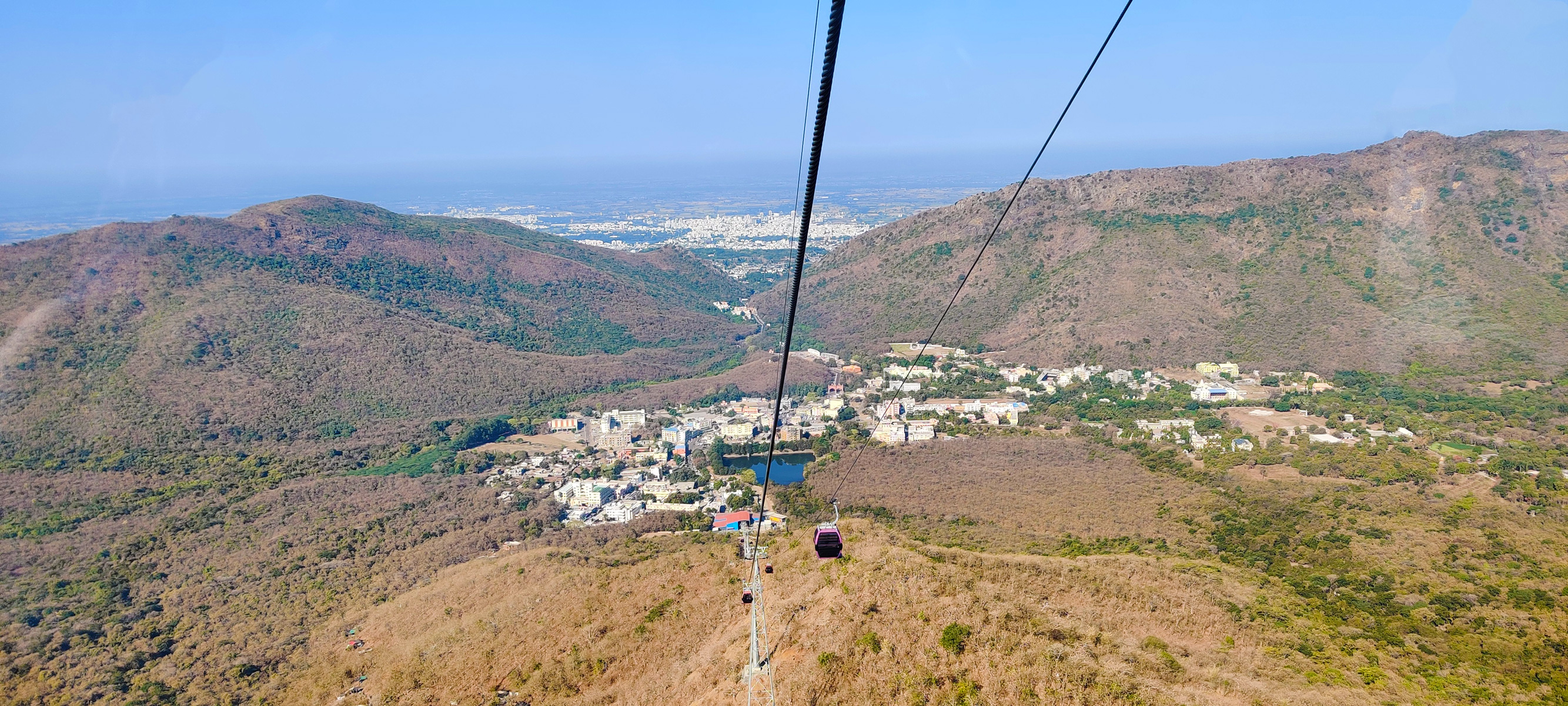
Girnar Ropeway

Girnar ropeway is Asia's longest ropeway. First proposed in 1983, the construction started only in September 2018 due to government approval delays and litigation. The construction and operation is managed by Usha Breco Limited. The project was inaugurated on 24 October 2020 by now Prime Minister Narendra Modi. The ropeway is 2,320 metres (7,610 feet) long and takes passengers 850 metres (2,790 feet) above the hill to the Ambika Jain temple (Ambaji) within 10 minutes.

== Jain Temples ==
Girnar Jain temples are a group of Śvetāmbara Jain temples and one Digambara temple atop Mount Girnar. Neminatha, the 22nd Tirthankara had renounced the world and become an ascetic, and then attained omniscience and liberation, all atop this mountain. Therefore, the hill is sacred to both the sects of Jainism.

It is home to sixteen exquisitely sculpted temples. The first peak, or Tunk, consists of the black granite temple dedicated to Lord Neminath, constructed in 1128 AD. The temple features intricate carvings on its pillars and is adorned with unique colored mosaics. The second Tunk houses the demi-goddess Ambika temple, while the third and fourth Tunks are significant for containing the foot-idols of Muni Śāmba Kumar and Pradyumna Kumar, who visited here. The fifth Tunk, requiring a climb of 10,000 steps from the base, enshrines the foot-idol of Bhagwan Neminath. Additionally, other sacred sites include the cave of Rajul, the Rathanemi temple (dedicated to Neminath's younger brother), and Sahasavan.

Girnar holds great significance in Jain history and legends. As per Jain scriptures, it is believed that Girnar has been in existence since eternity and that the 22nd Tirthankara Neminatha visited and performed his penance on this mountain in the present Avsarpini. Canonical Śvetāmbara scriptures such as Kalpa Sūtra, Āvassaya-sutta, Nāyā-dhamma-kahāo, Uttarajjhayaṇa-sutta and non-canonical ancient works of literature such as Prabhavak Charitra by Acharya Prabhachandrasuri, Neminah Chariu, and Samyaktva Saptatika by Acharya Haribhadrasuri, Trīṣaṣṭiśalākāpuruṣacharitra by Acharya Hemachandrasuri, Vastupala-Mahakavya by Acharya Udayprabhasuri, Kumarpalabhupal-Charitra by Acharya Jaisinhsuri, Jain Meghdoot by Acharya Merutungasuri, Raivatgirirasu by Acharya Vijaysensuri are some prominent scriptures emphasizing the importance of Girnar in Jainism.

Karnavihāra Prāsāda, one of the main temples atop the hill, is dedicated to Neminatha. Its main idol is made of black granite and the temple itself features Maru-Gurjara architecture. Vividha Tirtha Kalpa by Acharya Jinprabhasuri mentions that the original idol was made of clay and that the temple was made of wood. Ratnasār came to Girnar with a sangha and performed ritualistic bathing of the clay idol due to which it dissolved in the holy water. Due to this, Ratnasār got upset and fasted for 21 days, after which, demigoddess Ambika, pleased by his devotion, gave him an idol of Neminatha. Therefore the current idol of Neminatha was installed by a Śrāvaka named Ratnasār, from Kashmir, in the 10th century CE. He is said to have had obtained this idol from demigoddess Ambika. It was later renovated by Sajjana, a minister of Jaysimha Siddharaja in the 12th century CE. Sajjana utilized three years' worth of tax revenue collected from the people of Saurashtra. When Jaysimha Siddharaja got to know about the incident, he decided to investigate it. However, until then, Sajjana had already raised funds from the Śrāvakas and presented them to Siddharaja. Sajjana told Siddharaja that the temple was named Karnavihāra Prāsāda after Siddharaja's father Karnadev. Pleased with the gesture, Siddharaja approved the revenue funds spent on the renovation of the temple.

Apart from Karnavihāra Prāsāda, there are other temples dedicated to other Tirthankaras built across centuries such as: Adbad Adinath Temple, Panchmeru Temple, Merak Vasahi Temple, Sangram Soni's Temple, Kumarpala's Temple, Vastupala—Tejpala Temple, Mansingh Bhojraj Temple, Samprati Maharaja Temple, Amizara Parshwanath Temple, Rajimati's Cave, and Sahasavan Temple.

Shatrunjay Mahatmya, a text written by Acharya Dhaneshwarsuri, a monk of the Śvetāmbara sect of Jainism mentions that Sahasavan's original name was Sahasra-van (transl. a forest with thousands of mango trees). It is the place where Neminatha renounced the world and became an ascetic along with 1000 other kings on the 6th day of bright half of Shravan month. After 54 days of becoming an ascetic, Neminatha came back to Sahasavan, where he attained omniscience on the 15th day of dark half of Bhadrapad month. To commemorate the auspiciousness of both the events, Jains installed footprints of Neminatha at both these places.

Neminatha spent many years in spreading wisdom after attaining omniscience and then he attained Moksha on the fifth peak of Mount Girnar on the 8th day of bright half of Ashadha month. Footprints of Neminatha were placed at the spot where he attained moksha to commemorate the occasion. The temple that now houses an idol of Dattatreya, in renowned archaeologist James Burgess's archaeological survey, is said to have had Lord Neminath's sacred footprints and that it was administered by a naked ascetic (Digambara monk), implying that it was originally a Jain temple. However, currently, the place of Neminatha's nirvana is disputed between Jains and followers of Dattatreya who believe that it is also the place of Dattatreya's penance. An idol of Dattatreya was placed and a new shrine was built surrounding the footprints of Neminatha. Some cases between Jains and Hindus, seeking a reconstruction of canopies above the footprints of Neminatha and a removal of the idol of Dattatreya that was illegally established in 2004 and other illegal constructions are pending in the Gujarat High Court.

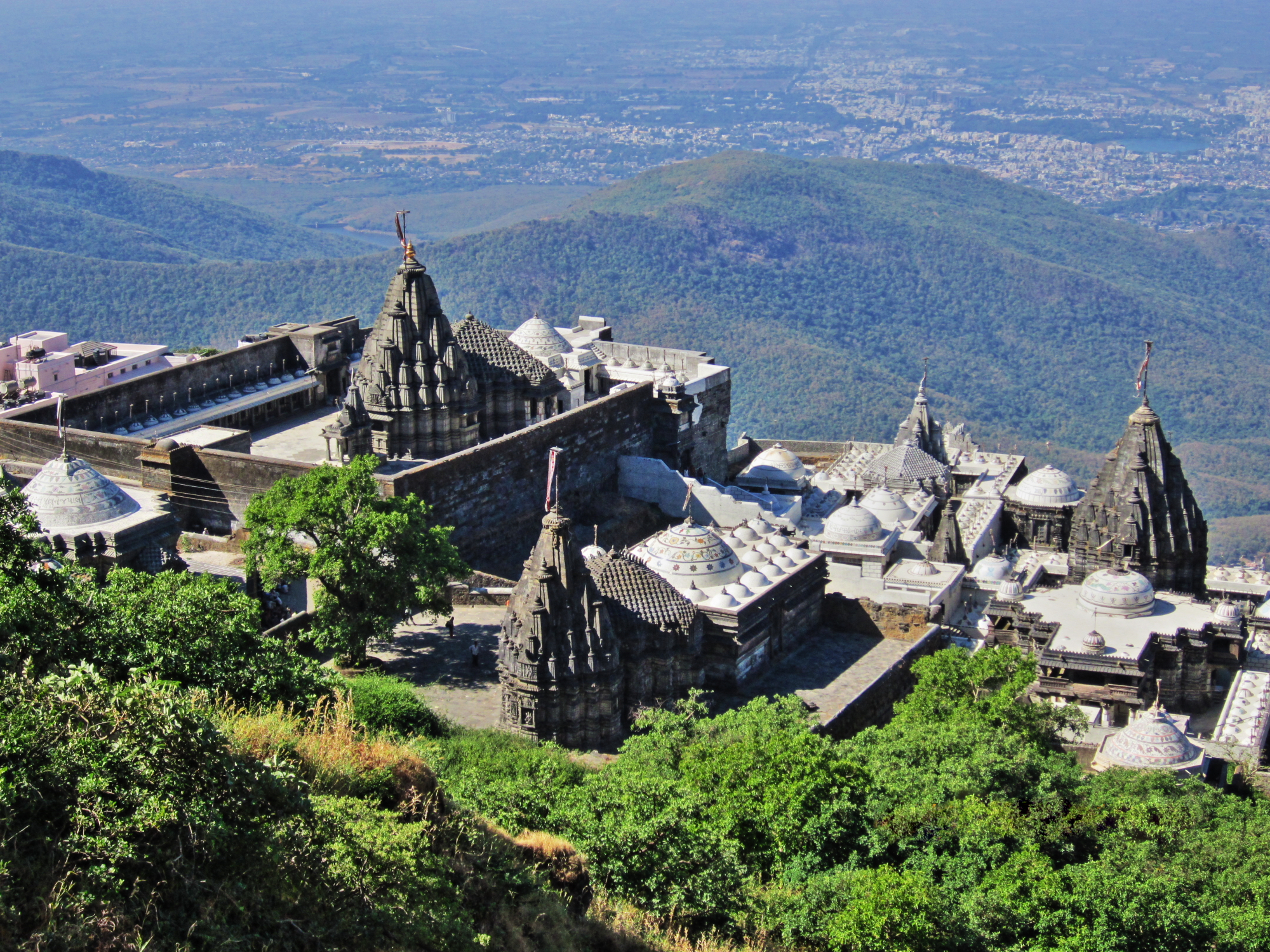
Jain Temple on Girnar mountain

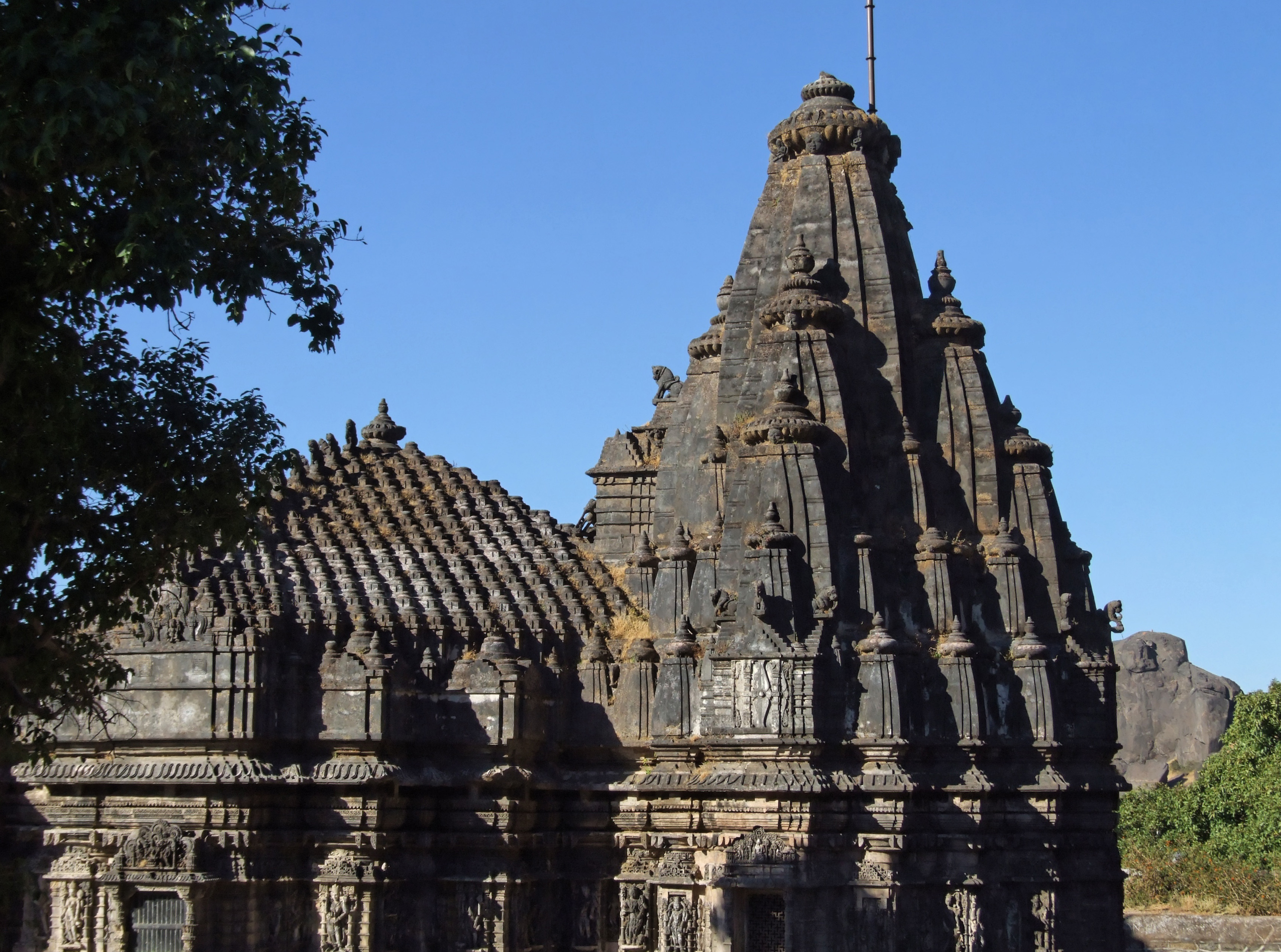
Arisht Neminath temple

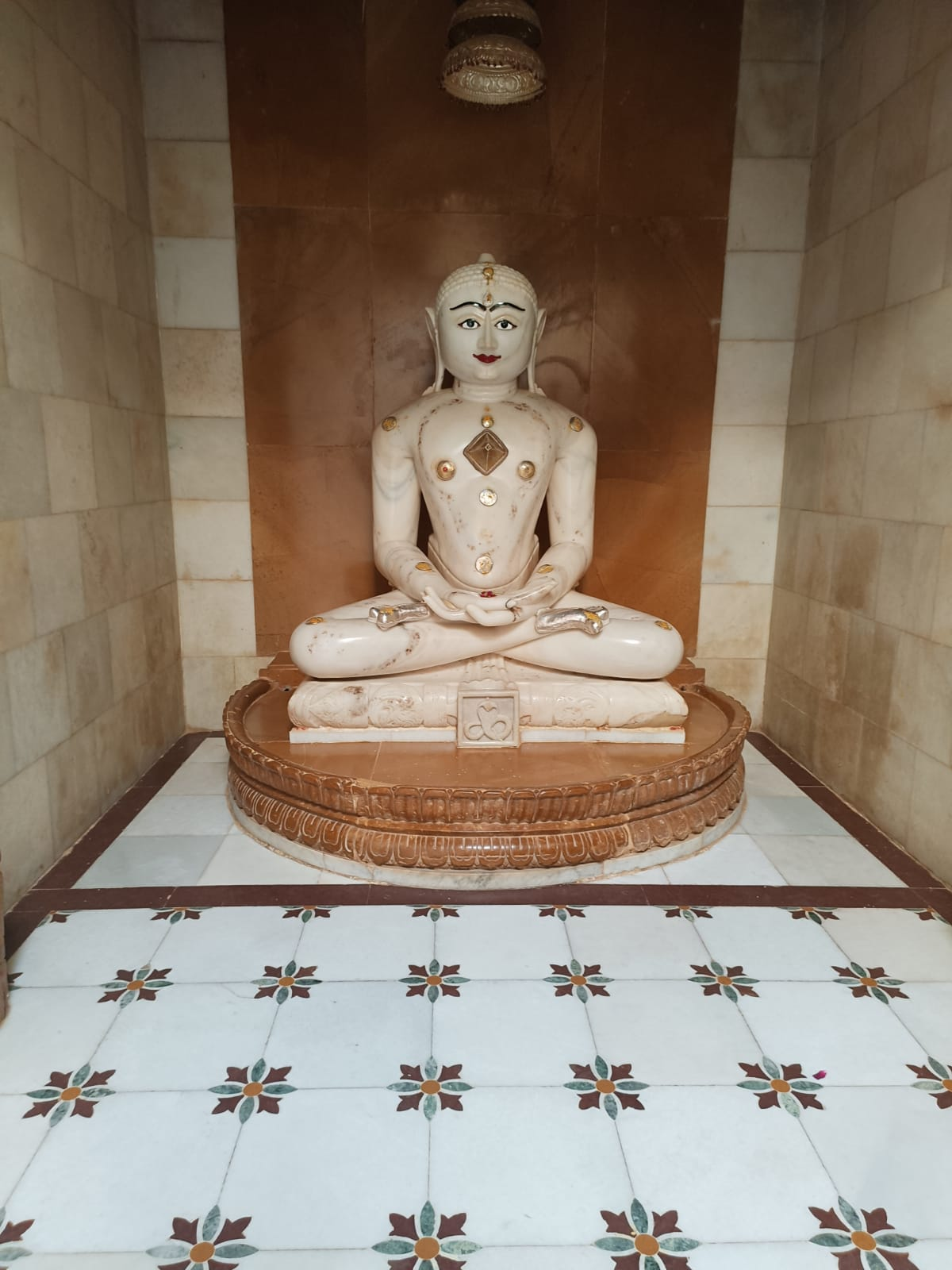
Ancient Idol of Amizara Parshwanath in a Cave Temple at Girnar Hill

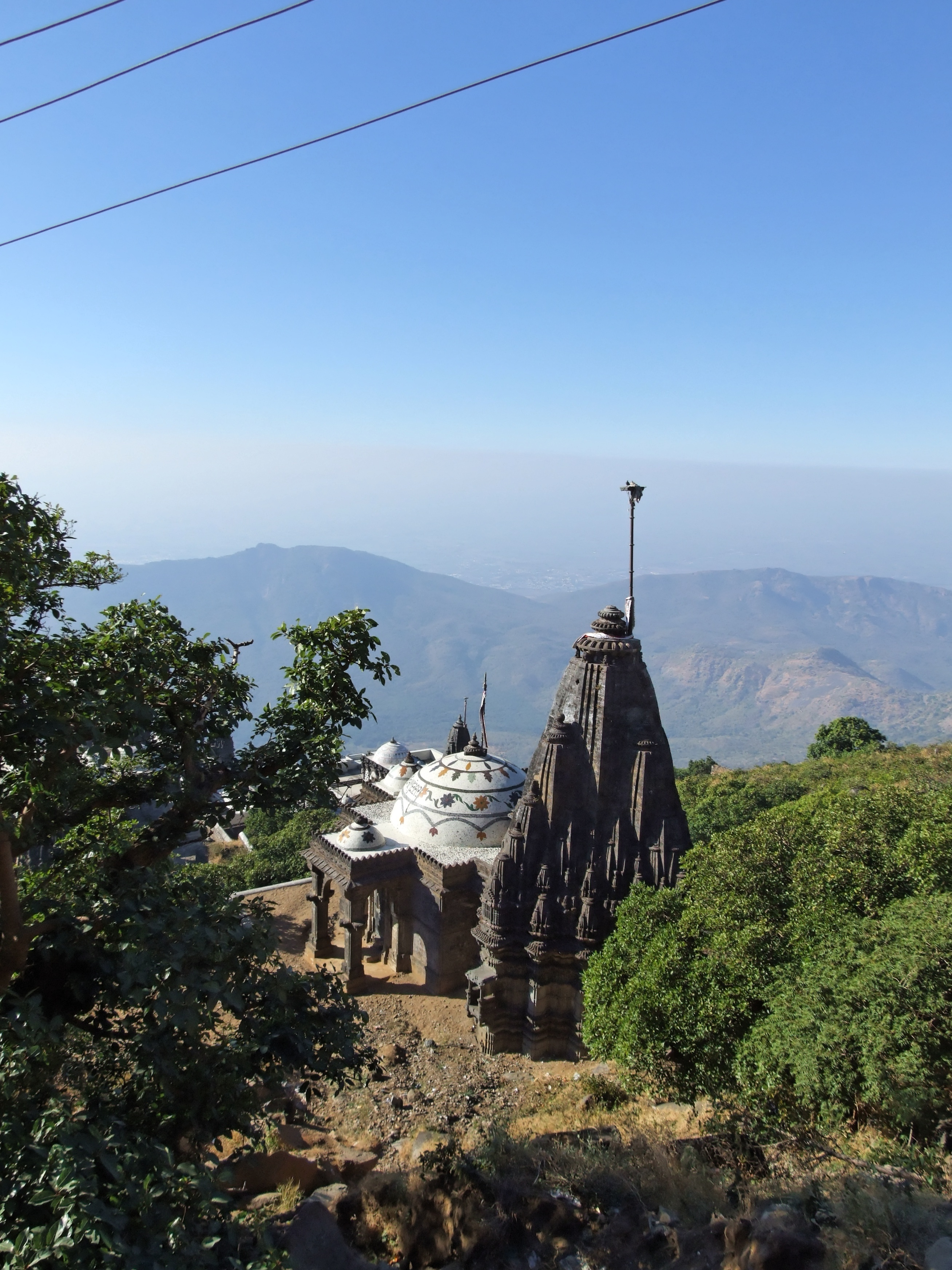
Kumarapala temple

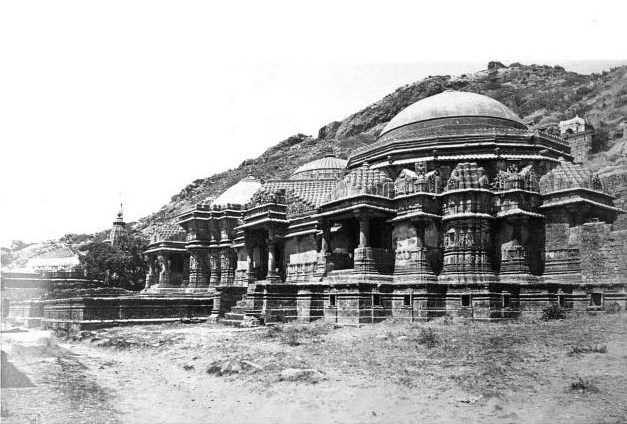
Vastupala Vihara

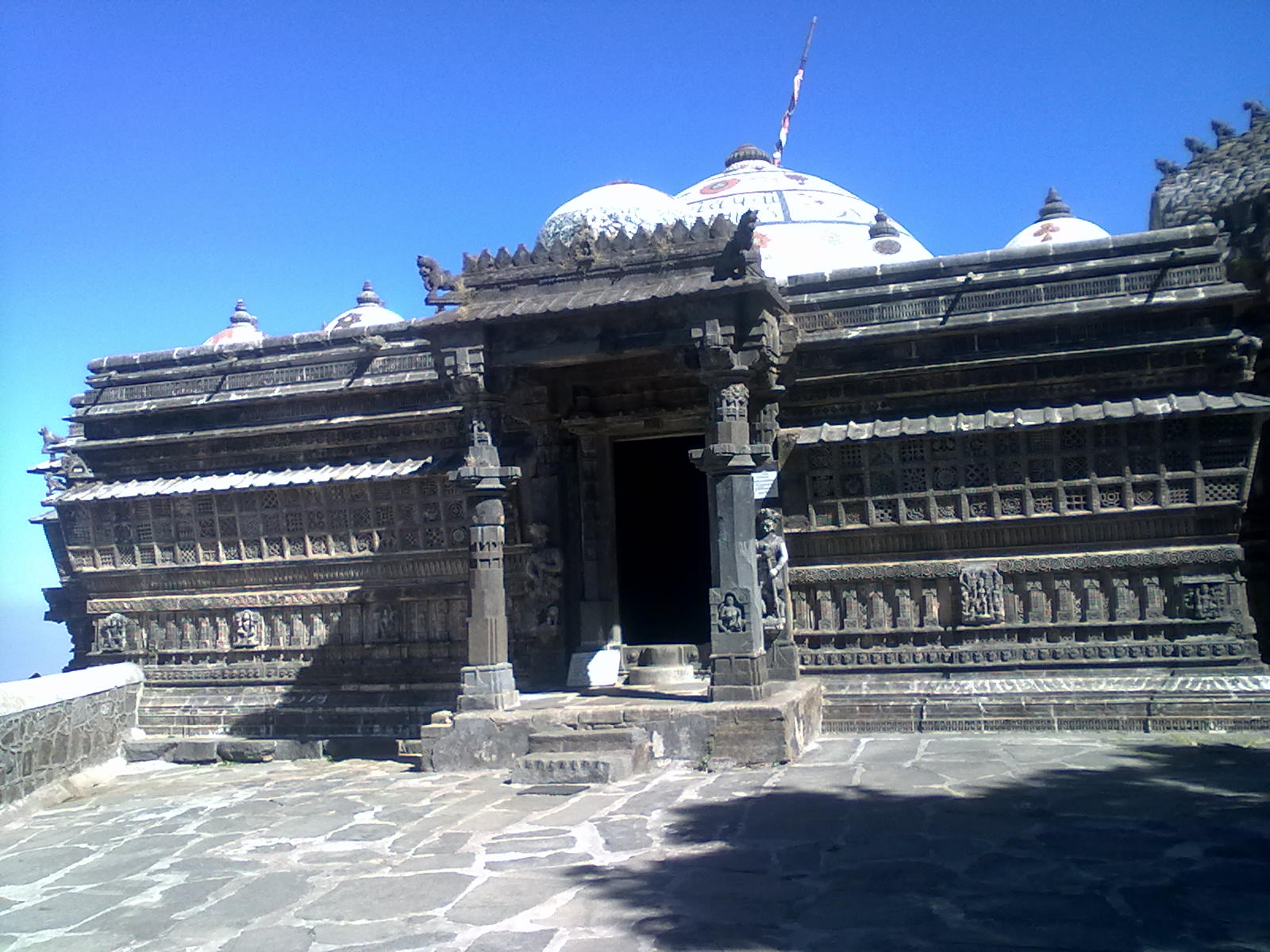
Samprati Raja temple

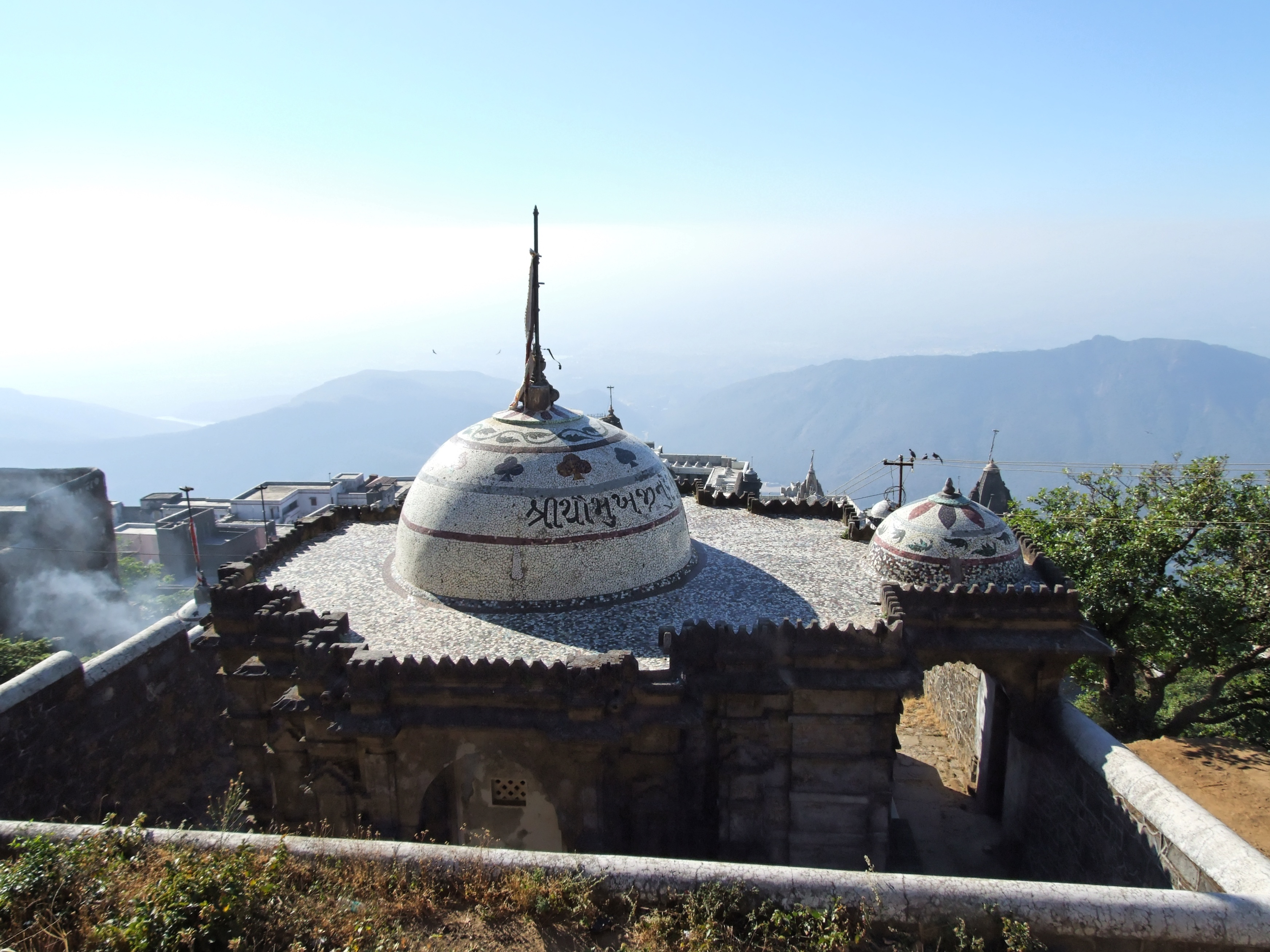
Chaumukhji Temple

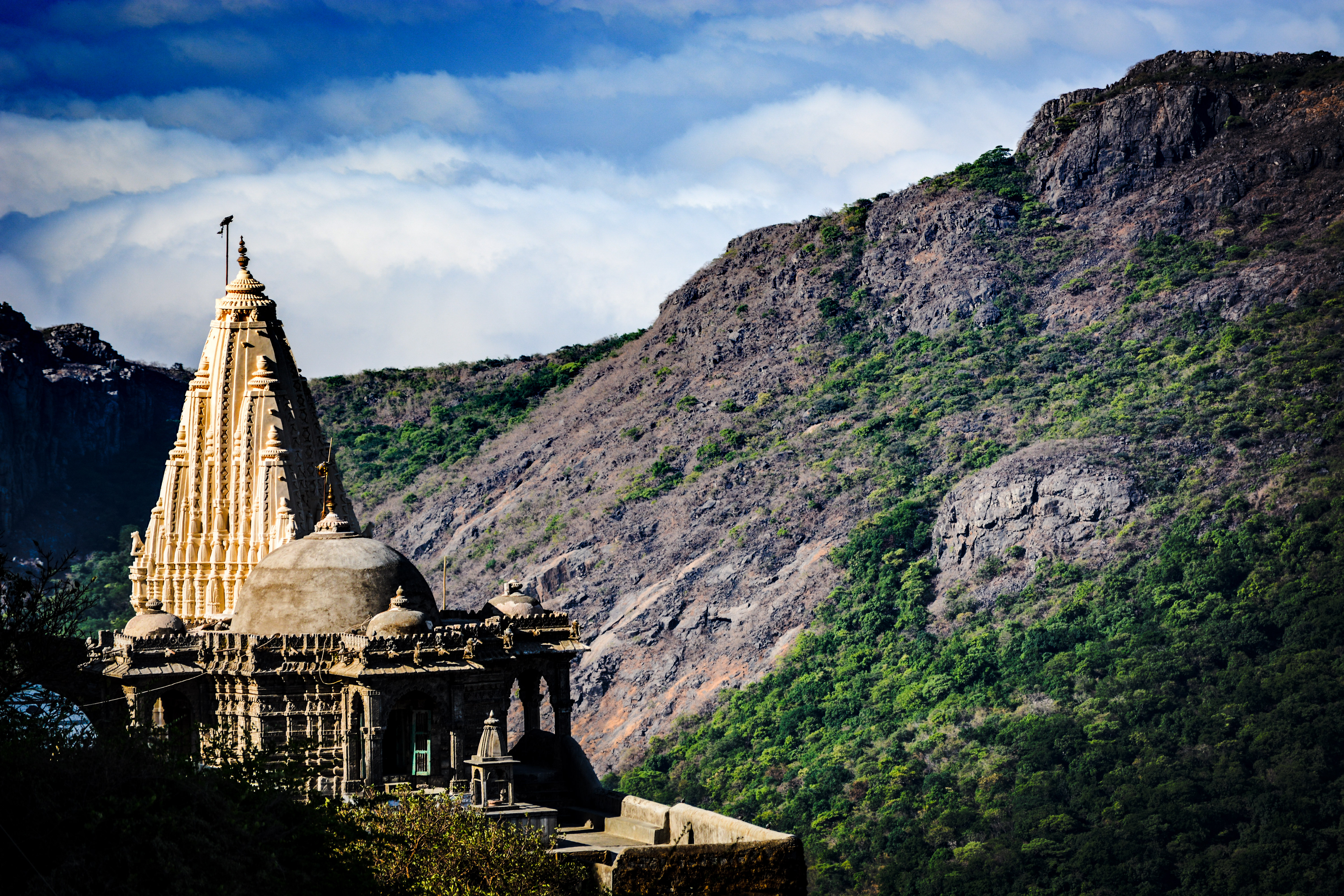
Dharamchand Hemchand temple

== Ambika Temple ==
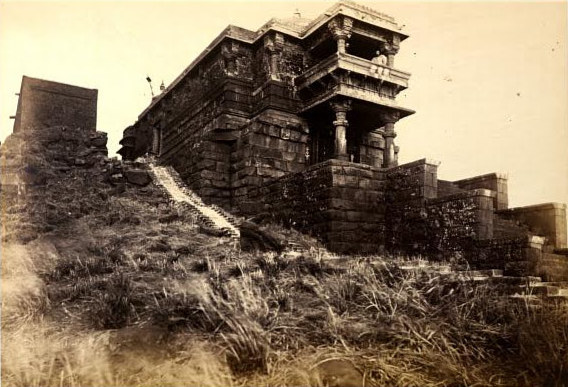
Ambika Temple in 1876

This temple is dedicated to Jain deity Ambika yakshi (Ambaji), an attendant of Lord Neminath. The early temple was built before 784 CE (probably in middle of the 8th century) because Digambar Jain Acharya Jinasen's Harivamsapurana (Saka Samvat 705, 783 CE) mentions the temple. An inscription dated Vikram Samvat 1249 (1192 CE) mentions Vaghela minister Vastupala's pilgrimage to Ambika temple on Raivataka (Girnar) hill. Narendraprabhsuri mentions that Vastupala had installed idols of himself and his brother Tejapala in the temple. Jinharshasuri mentions that Vastupala and his brother Tejapala visited as well as built the large mandapa of the temple and parikara of Ambika. A praśasti eulogy given at the end in a golden lettered copy of Kalpasutra dated Vikram Samvat 1524 (1468 CE) mentions that a Jain Shreshthi (merchant) named Samal Sah restored and renovated the Ambika temple on Girnar. As mentioned in Jain pilgrimage travelogues, the temple had Ambika as a Jain yakshika deity. The Girnar patta from Samvat 1507 in Ranakpur Jain temple also depicts Ambika in the similar manner. The temple is built according to the Jain tradition and the mandapa ceiling match with the Girnar Jain temples.

The present temple is built around the 15th century. The temple was historically a Jain temple. So the temple construction, renovation and reconstruction history extends from the mid-8th century to the 15th century.

As per archaeologist James Burgess's works on Gujarat's history, Ambika temple was not a Hindu shrine and that Jains had built it and Hindus had occupied it later.

The Raivataka mountain was a mountain mentioned in the epic Mahābhārata and in the Harivaṃśa-purāṇa 2.55.111. In the Mahabharata it was mentioned as situated in the Anarta Kingdom. In the Harivaṃśa-purāṇa it is "close to the sporting ground of the King Raivataka" (2.56.29) and called "the living place for the gods" (2.55.111). People from Dvārakā visited this mountain and celebrated its worshipping as a grand festival. The same mountain also features prominently in Māgha's Śiśupāla-vadha. This mountain is identified to be the Girnar mountains in Gujarat.

== Hindu Temples ==
Atop Girnar's highest peak, known as Neminath Shikhar, reached by a 10,000-step climb, is a temple occupied by devotees of Dattatreya. This temple, in archaeologist James Burgess's Western-India's Archeological survey, is said to have had Neminatha's sacred foot-idols and that it was administered by a "naked ascetic". The Jain community has contested the ownership and worship rights of this temple in the Gujarat High Court, and the matter remains under judicial consideration. On the trek from Ambika's temple to the disputed site, there is a Gorakhnath temple located on the intermediate peak.

Further up there is a lower peak which is not easily accessible where a shrine of Mahakali is located which is also known as Mahakali Khappar by locals. On the second trail to descent the mountain, there are two temples called Bharat-van and Sita-van which are located in the forests named after Sita and Bharata.

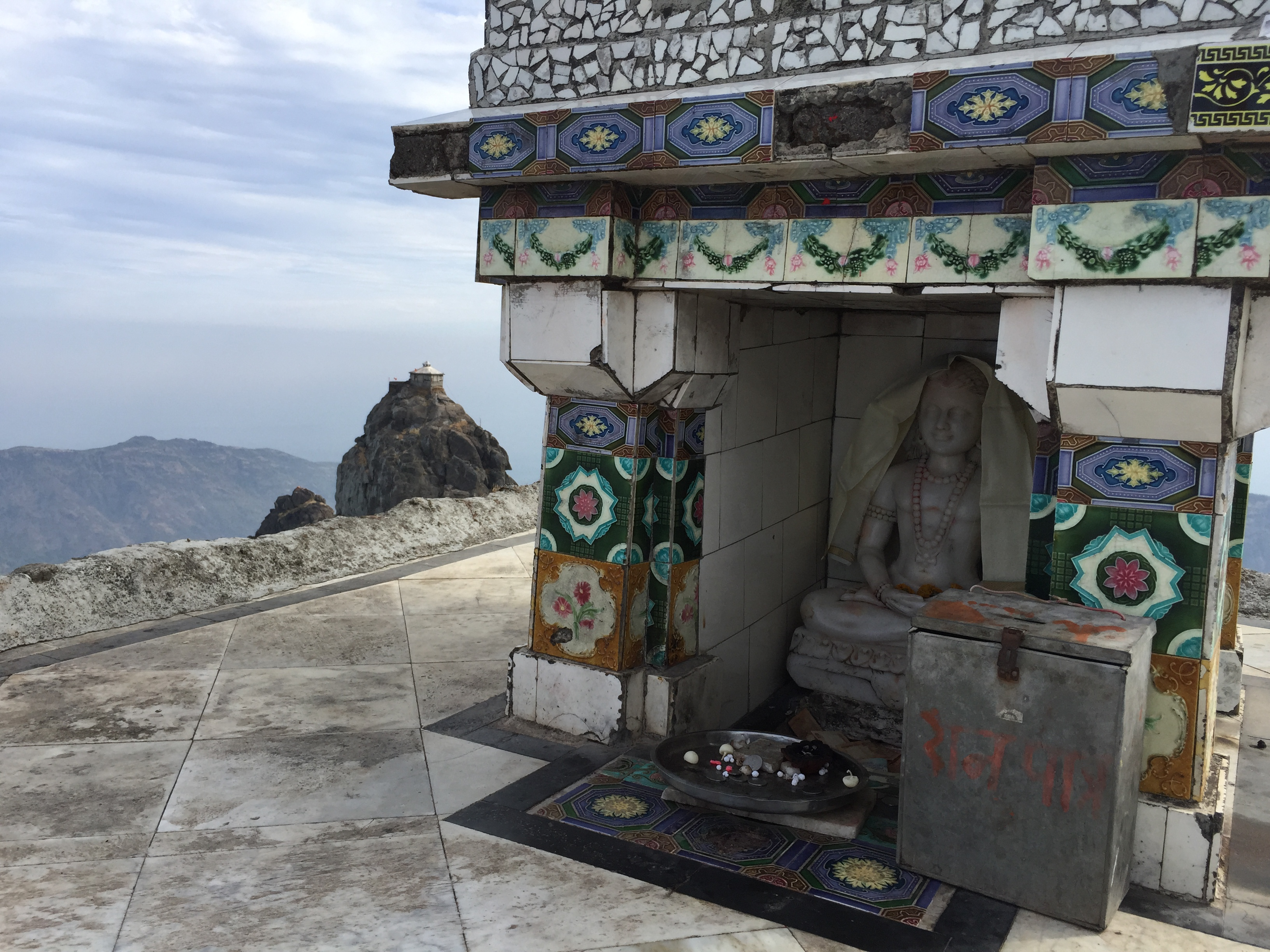
Gorakhnath Temple of Girnar

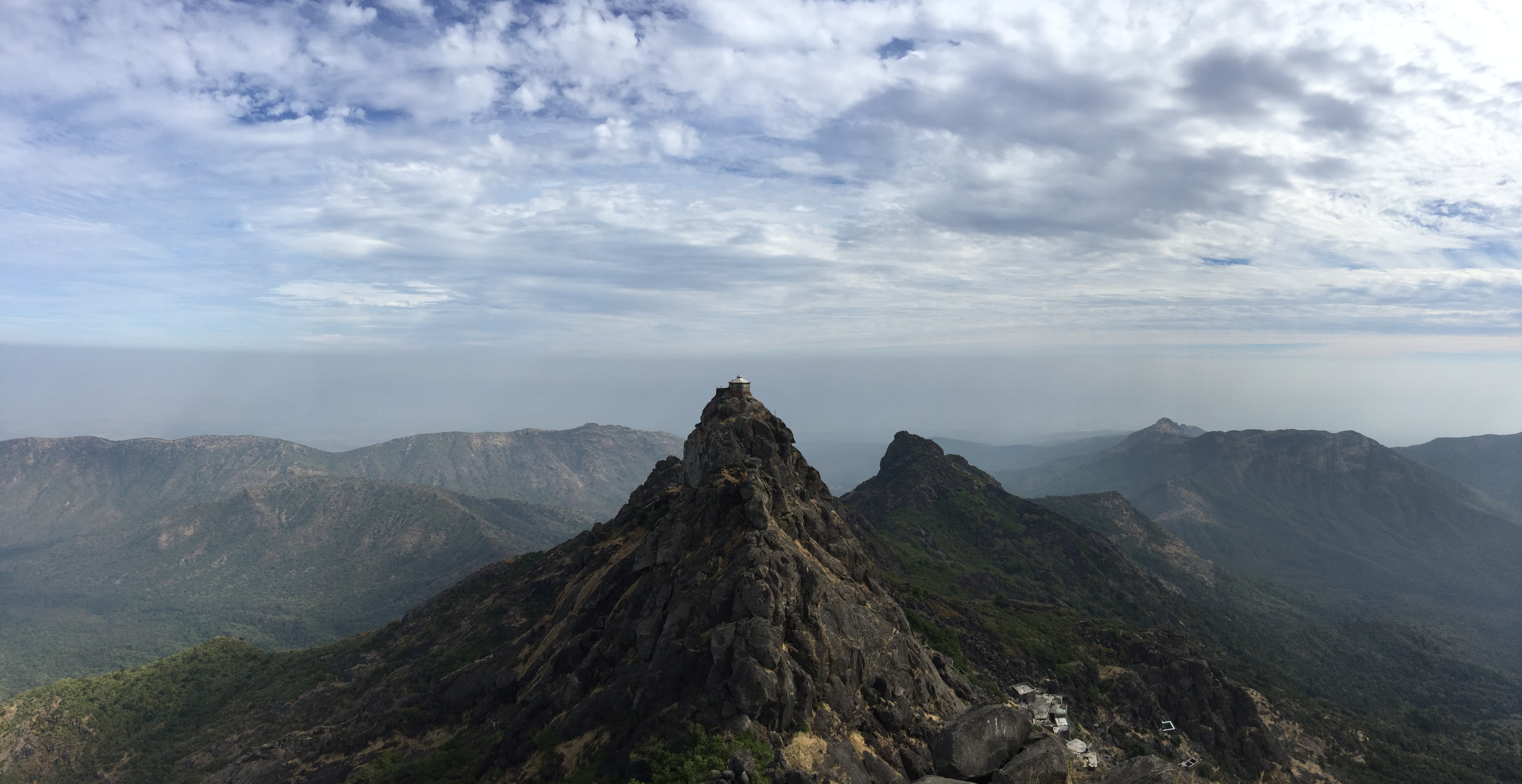
Dattatreya(Neminath) Temple of Girnar

== Girnar's Initial trek ==
The base of the mountain, known as Girnar Taleti, is about 4 km east of the center of Junagadh. There are temples and other sacred places all along this stretch.

The traveller, in order to reach Girnar Taleti from Junagadh city, will pass through the Wagheshwari or Vagheshwari Gate (Girnar Darwaza), which is close to the Uparkot fort area, Easterly.

At about 200 metres from the gate, to the right of the road, is the Temple of Wagheshwari (Upale Vagheshwari maa), which is joined to the road by a causeway about 150 yards long. An ancient Verai Mata mandir and a modern Gayatri Shakti Peeth mandir are nearby.

About a furlong beyond this is a stone bridge, and just beyond it on the right are the Ashoka's Major Rock Edicts. The edicts are inscribed high up on a large, domed mass of black granite measuring roughly 20 feet x 30 feet. The inscription is in Brahmi script.

On leaving Ashoka's edicts, the route crosses the handsome bridge over the Sona-rekha, which here forms a fine sheet of water over golden sand, then passes a number of temples, at first on the left bank of the river and then on the right, to the largest of the temples. This is dedicated to Damodar, a name of Krishna, from Dam, a rope, because by tradition his mother in vain attempted to confine him with a rope when a child. The reservoir, Damodar Kund, at this place is accounted very sacred.

Next is an old shrine of Bhavnath, a form of Shiva, close to Girnar Taleti; Mrigi kund and Sudharshan lake are nearby.

Most persons who are not active climbers will probably proceed up the mountain in a swing doli from Taleti. A long ridge runs up from the west, and culminates in a rugged scarped rock, on the top of which are the temples. Close to the old shrine is a well called the Chadani vav.

The paved way begins just beyond this and continues for two-thirds of the ascent. The first resthouse, Chadia Parab, is reached, 480 feet, above the plain; and the second halting-place at Dholi-deri, 1000 feet above the plain. From here the ascent becomes more difficult, winding under the face of the precipice to the third resthouse, 1400 feet up. The path turns to the right along the edge of a precipice, which is very narrow, so that the doli almost grazes the scarp, which rises perpendicularly 200 feet above the traveller. On the right is seen the lofty mountain of Datar, covered with low jungle. At about 1500 feet there is a stone dharmsala, and from this there is a fine view of the rock called the Bhairav-Thampa, "the terrific leap," because devotees used to cast themselves from its top, falling 1000 feet or more.

At 2370 feet above Junagadh, the gate of the enclosure known as the Deva Kota, or Ra Khengar's Palace, is reached.

== Current situation at Neminath Shikhar ==
Currently, the highest peak of Girnar has been a matter of dispute with Jain community calling construction of Hindu temple around the ancient foot-idols of Neminath as illegal. As per the claim, structure and idol of Dattatreya was placed illegally by Hindu pandits near the footprints in 2004. Despite the Gujarat High Court order, the Hindu idol has not been removed. A deadly attack using sharp weapons on Jain Digambara monk was also seen in this region in January 2013.

== Festivals ==
Jain festivals like Mahavir Jayanti, Paryushana, and birth and nirvana kalyanaks of Lord Neminath are celebrated by Jains.

The main event for Hindus is the Maha Shivaratri fair held every year on the 14th day of the Hindu calendar month of Magha. At least 1 million pilgrims visit the fair to participate in pooja and parikrama of Girnar hill. The procession begins at Bhavnath Mahadev Temple at Bhavnath. It then proceeds onwards to various akharas of various sects of sadhus, which are in Girnar hill from ancient times. The procession of sadhus and pilgrims ends again at Bhavnath temple after visiting Madhi, Malavela and Bor Devi temple. The fair begins with hoisting of fifty-two Gaja long flags at Bhavnath Mahadev temple. This fair is the backbone of the economy of Junagadh, as more than ten lakh pilgrims who visit the fair generate a revenue of 250 million in only five days.

== Tanks ==
Outside to the north of the Kumarapala's temple, there is the Bhima Kunda, a tank measuring 70 feet by 50 feet. Below it and on the verge of the cliff is a smaller tank of water and near it a small canopy supported by three roughly hewn pillars and a piece of rock containing a short octagonal stone called Hathi pagla or Gajapada, the elephant foot, a stratum on the top of which is of light granite and the rest of dark the lower part is immersed in water most of the year.

As per historical records, Sajjana, the minister of Chaulukya king Siddharaja Jayasimha, built the Neminatha temple using the state treasury. When he collected the funds to return as a compensation, the king declined to accept it so the funds were used to build the temple.

Sahasraphana (thousand hooded) Parshwanatha, the image which was consecrated in 1803 CE (VS 1459) by Vijayajinendra Suri, is currently the central deity in the temple. The temple originally housed the golden image of Mahavira and brass images of Shantinatha and Parshwanatha on its sides.

The east facing temple has 52 small shrines surrounding the central temple. It has an open portico with ceilings with fine carvings. In the bhamti or cloisters surrounding the court, there are also some remarkable designs in carved ceilings. The roof of the rangamandapa has fine carvings. The shrine proper must have been removed and replaced with new one at the end of the sixteenth century or the start of the seventeenth century. It is known that Karmachandra Bachchhavat, minister of the king of Bikaner, had sent a funds to renovate temple in Shatrunjaya and Girnar under Jinachandrasuri IV of Kharatara Gaccha during the reign of Akbar. There is a shrine housing replica of Ashtapada hill in the south, shrine with Shatrunjayavatar in west, behind the main temple, and Samet Shikhar (or Nandishwar Dwipa) in north.

== See also ==
- Girnar Jain temples
- Palitana Temples
- Shikharji
- Radha Damodar Temple, Junagadh
- Sacred mountains of India
