= Tirth Pat =

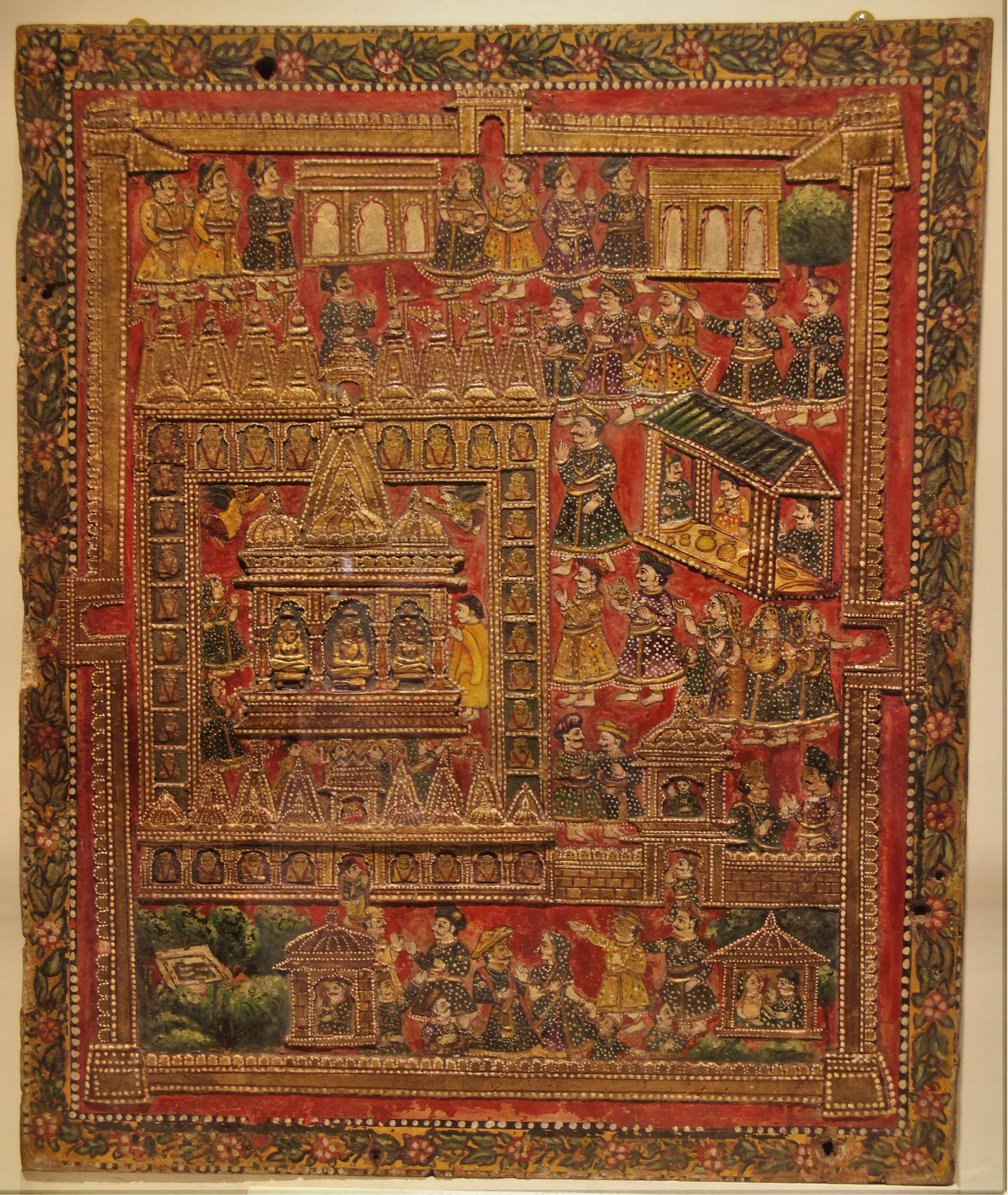
- Tirth Pat on display at Prince of Wales museum, Mumbai
- Artist: Unknown
- Year: 20th century CE
- Type: Wood carving & painting
- Medium: Wood
- Location: Prince of Wales museum, Mumbai

Tirth Pat or Patta is a religious map and topographical rendering used in Śvētāmbara Jainism religion for representing places of pilgrimage (Tirtha). Tirth Pat is different than the conventional map making and is not drawn to scale. Tirth Pat is not indicative of distances, elevation, topography and direction and is solely used for evocation of Jain pilgrimages (Tirthas). It is believed in Jainism that mere viewing of a Tirth Pat earns merit for a devotee.

== Belief ==
The Śvētāmbara Jains hold five centers of pilgrimage to be most sacred. These places are Shatrunjaya and Girnar in Gujarat, Mount Abu in Rajasthan, Shikharji in Jharkhand and Ashtapada in Himalayas. People who are unable to go for the pilgrimage, can achieve its religious merits by viewing cartographical overview of the pilgrimage site on Tirth Pat. Every year (in October - November), Tirth Pat is hung in the vicinity of a Jain temple or at a prepared location for devotees to worship.

== Gallery ==
Shatrunjaya Tirtha Patta

Shikharji Tirtha Patta

== See also ==
- Śvētāmbara
- Jainism
- Kalachakra
