= Bhavsinhji II =

Maharaja of Bhavnagar from 1896–1919

- Maharaja Raol Sir Shri Colonel Bhavsinhji II Takhtsinhji
- Reign: 1896 until 1919
- Born: 26 April 1875
- Died: 16 July 1919 (aged 44)
- Father: Sir Takhtsinhji

Maharaja Raol Sir Shri Colonel Bhavsinhji II Takhtsinhji, KCSI (26 April 1875 – 16 July 1919) was a Maharaja from the Gohil dynasty, who ruled the Bhavnagar State in western India from 1896 until 1919.

== Early life ==
Born on 26 April 1875, Bhavsinhji II was the eldest son of Sir Takhtsinhji. He was educated at Rajkumar College, Rajkot like his father who was the first student in 1870. He was attached to the 2nd Bombay Lancers and served in the Bhavnagar State Forces from 1894 until 1896. He was appointed Honorary Lieutenant-Colonel in 1918.

== Marriage ==
Bhavsinhji was first married to Devkunvarba of Deogarh Baria and had a daughter from the marriage. After her death, he married Nanadkunvarba of Khirasara. From his second marriage, he had a son Krishna Kumarsinhji Bhavsinhji, born in 1912, who later succeeded him to the throne.

== Accession ==
He was installed on the gaddi (throne) at the Darbargadh Palace in Bhavnagar on 10 February 1896.

== Reign ==
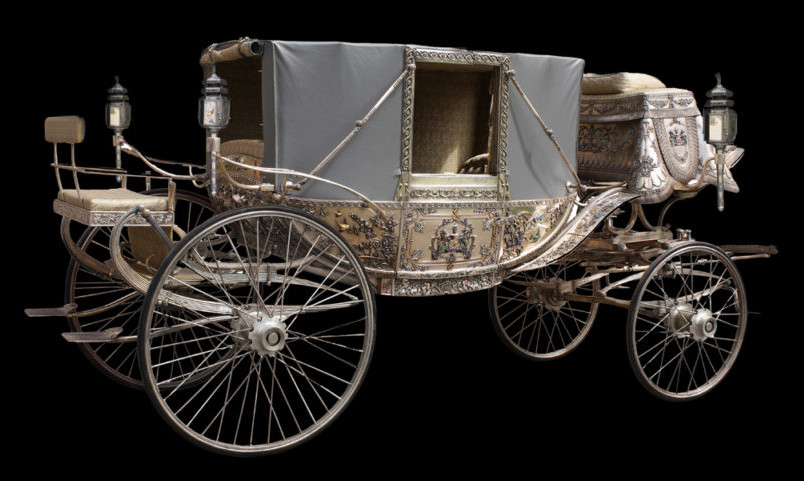
Silver Landau carriage commissioned by Bhavsinhji in 1915, now in the Khalili Collection of Enamels of the World

He earned a name as a progressive ruler and continued the modernisation and development programmes instituted by his father Sir Takhatsinhji. During the early part of his reign, when the State faced the Great Famine of 1900, he issued a famine code and personally visited the affected parts of his kingdom. As a part of famine relief measures, he waived all uncollected taxes and distributed tagari allowances as free gifts. He also initiated the construction of five filter beds and a large service reservoir for future droughts.

He was one of the first princely states to start self-governance to people and instituted People's Representative Assembly, comprising farmers, tradesmen, municipal representatives and landholders.

Further, he started first Harijan School in 1912 for the upliftment of Dalit people of his State, and also instituted scholarships for further studies in England, America and Japan, particularly in the fields of medicine and science.

As a measure of famine relief works, he founded the Bhavnagar Darbar Bank in 1902 to dispense loans to farmers, merchants and traders, and began a co-operative movement. This bank founded by him and Prime Minister of Bhavnagar, Prabhashankar Pattani later grew in to State Bank of Saurashtra.

He was made Knight Commander of the Order of the Star of India in 1904.

An army of Bhavnagar was sent to assist British army in First World War. Bhavsinhji and his wife raised a private Bhavnagar War Hospital in 1916 from their personal funds, for treatment of the injured soldiers serving British army in First World War and also instituted a State war medal for the soldiers.

== Scholar ==
He distinguished scholar of varied interests. He composed four parts of the Sangeet Mala, a treatise on the medicinal properties of Indian plants. He also published the Manual of Indian Ayurvedic Pharmacy. Further, he published translation of Homer's Iliad, a musical composition of Macaulay's Horatius. He was also member of management committee of Rajkumar College of Rajkot and authored The Forty Years of the Rajkumar College in seven volumes (1911).

The introduction of the Tonic Sol-fa system of notation into Indian music was largely due to his efforts.

== Death ==
He died on 16 July 1919 and his son, Krishna Kumarasingh Bhavasingh, succeeded him to throne of Bhavnagar State.

== Honors ==
- Delhi Darbar Gold Medal - 1903
- Knight Commander of the Order of the Star of India - 24 June 1904
- Granted the personal title of Maharaja Bahadur, 1 January 1909 (later made hereditary in recognition of war services from 1 January 1918)
- Delhi Darbar Gold Medal - 1911

== Memorials ==
Sir Bhavsinhji Polytechnic Institute was established in commemoration of Bhavsinhji II by his son and successor Sir Krishnakumarsinhji in 1932, which commenced functioning in 1949.
