= Daksha Pattani =

Gujarati critic and a scholar on Mahatma Gandhi

- Born: 4 November 1938; Bhavnagar, India
- Died: 10 March 2019 (aged 80)

Academic background
- Education: BA, Gujarati and Sanskrit, Gujarat University, 1962; MA, Gujarati and Sanskrit, Gujarat University, 1965; PhD, 1976
- Thesis: Gandhijinu Jeevan Ane Temna Siddhanto (Life and Philosophy of Gandhi) (1975)
- Doctoral advisor: Ishwarlal R. Dave

Academic work
- Discipline: Gujarati language, Gandhian philosophy
- Institutions: Valiya Arts and Mehta Commerce College
- Main interests: Mahatma Gandhi
- Notable works: Gandhijinu Chintan (1980), Gandhijina Vyaktitvanu Ghadtar (1981), Gandhiji: Dharmavicharna (1984), Gandhivichar – Satya Ane Ahimsa (2000), Gandhijina Vicharma Satyagraha (2001), Gandhijinu Chintan: Mulyankan (2003)

Daksha Vijayshankar Pattani (4 November 1938 – 10 March 2019) was a Gujarati academic and author from India. She was noted as a scholar on Mahatma Gandhi; her 1976 doctoral thesis on Gandhi's philosophy was later published in six volumes.

== Early life and education ==
Daksha Pattani was born on 4 November 1938 in Bhavnagar in the Prashnora Nagar Brahmin family of Shantaben and Vijayshankar Kanji Pattani, a scholar and writer. She was a younger sister of writer Mukundrai Parasharya and niece of Prabhashankar Pattani, erstwhile prime minister of Bhavnagar State. She completed her primary and secondary education in Bhavnagar. She received a BA in Gujarati and Sanskrit in 1962, an MA in the same subjects in 1965, and a PhD under the guidance of Ishwarlal R. Dave in 1976. She received these degrees from Gujarat University. Her doctoral thesis was titled Gandhijinu Jeevan Ane Temna Siddhanto (Life and Philosophy of Gandhi).

== Career ==
Pattani taught Gujarati at the Gharshala school in Bhavnagar from 1962 to 1965. She taught at the Gurukul Mahila Arts College in Porbandar from 1969 to 1970 and later served as a professor at the Valiya Arts and Mehta Commerce College in Bhavnagar from 1970 until her retirement in 2001. She also served as a part-time professor of Gujarati and Gandhian Philosophy at the Bhavnagar University from 1977 to 1994. She served part-time with the Gujarat Vidyapith and Lokbharati in Sanosara. From 1982 to 2013, she was a member of a committee propagating Gandhian philosophy formed by the Bhavnagar-based organisation, Gandhismriti.

She died on 10 March 2019 after suffering from heart disease.

== Works ==
The chapters of Pattani's doctoral thesis were published in six volumes: Gandhijinu Chintan (1980), Gandhijina Vyaktitvanu Ghadtar (1981), Gandhiji: Dharmavicharna (1984), Gandhivichar – Satya Ane Ahimsa (2000), Gandhijina Vicharma Satyagraha (2001), Gandhijinu Chintan: Mulyankan (2003). The first two volumes in the series were awarded the Bhagini Nivedita Prize by the Gujarati Sahitya Parishad. These works examine images of Gandhi from various angles. According to Kirtida Shah, Pattani's perspective on Gandhi and his philosophy is unique. Pattani's more than fifty essays, criticism and lectures are published in other edited works.

== See also ==
- List of Gujarati-language writers
