= Chinoy =

Chinoy may refer to

- Chinese Filipino
- CHInoyTV, a weekly television program in the Philippines
- Chinoy (surname)
- Chinoy (musician) (born Mauricio Castillo in 1982), Chilean singer-songwriter
- Chinoy, fictional criminal portrayed by Danny Denzongpa in the 1985 Indian film Yudh
