= Prabhashankar Pattani =

Early 20th century Diwan of Bhavnagar State, Gujarat, India

Sir Prabhashankar Dalpatram Pattani
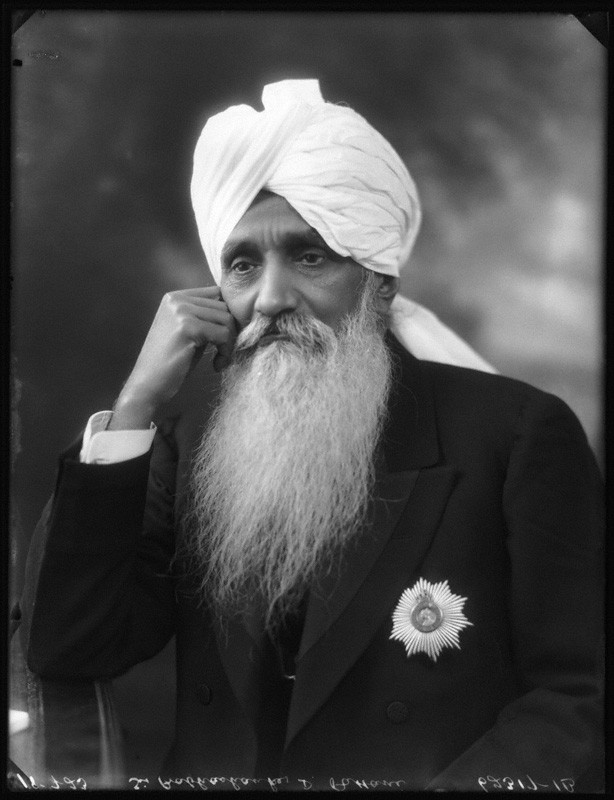
- Sir Prabhashankar Pattani in 1923, Made by Bassano. Taken from National Portrait Gallery, London
- Born: 15 April 1862; Morbi, Morvi State, Kathiawar Agency, British Raj (now Morbi, Gujarat, India)
- Died: 16 February 1938 (aged 75); Bhavnagar, Bhavnagar State, Western India States Agency, British Raj (now Bhavnagar, Gujarat, India)
- Education: Kathiawar High School, Rajkot
- Known for: Prime minister of Bhavnagar State
- Spouse(s): Kunki, Rama

Sir Prabhashankar Dalpatram Pattani KCIE (Gujarati: સર પ્રભાશંકર પટ્ટણી) (15 April 1862 – 16 February 1938) was the prime minister or Diwan of Bhavnagar State in Gujarat, India. He was born in a Nagar Brahmin family in 1862 in Morbi. He was known for his forthrightness, diplomacy, and noble character. He was a close friend of Mahatma Gandhi.

== Childhood and education ==
Pattani completed the seventh standard exams in Gujarat and traveled to Rajkot to complete his studies. He ranked first in the Kathiavar Peninsula and married the daughter of Zandu Bhatt, who was an Ayurveda Doctor. On one occasion, one of Pattani's in-laws criticized his financial status, declaring that he did not deserve to use the Bhatt family name due to his economic class. Pattani then changed his surname from Bhatt to Pattani.

== Prime Minister of Bhavnagar ==
Pattani entered a medical college in Mumbai to become a doctor. However, his health soon deteriorated and he had to leave his studies in order to return to Gujarat. After taking a few small jobs, he secured a tutoring job in Rajkumar College, Rajkot. During Pattani's time there, Bhavnagar's prince Bhavsinhji II was also studying at Rajkumar College and Pattani was appointed his designated tutor. They developed a very good relationship during their time at the college. Pattani not only helped the prince financially whenever he needed extra money, but he also nurtured him and helped him overcome his anger. Once Bhavsinghji became King of Bhavangar state, he requested that Pattani become Prime Minister of the state. However, Pattani did not want to oust the incumbent Prime Minister, and so joined the state as Secretary of the King. He later became Prime Minister in 1903, remaining at various posts in Bhavnagar state until his death in 1938.

Pattani valued a good education and offered sponsorships for students from Bhavnagar State and other states to study at the Massachusetts Institute of Technology.

== Relationship with Mahatma Gandhi ==
Pattani and Mahatma Gandhi knew each other during their study at Rajkot. When Gandhi was in South Africa, Pattani used to keep track of his activities and movements. Their friendship grew when Gandhi returned to India in 1915. Pattani respected Gandhi, despite often disagreeing with his decisions. During the 1923 Satyagraha, when there were many violent incidents, he met with Gandhi and argued that with such incidents the root belief of non-violence would become compromised and the world would see this satyagraha as conceited. Gandhi eventually called a halt to the movement.

Pattani took a special interest in encouraging Gandhi to attend the 2nd Round Table Conference in England. He told Gandhi that "I know that this conference might not be successful. However, your going there will not be futile as you can share the details about the current state of affairs in India with English citizens. Currently, they are getting biased news about India and our freedom movement. When the citizens of England will come to know about the true news and our rightful claim for freedom, they will demand the same with the English Government." Pattani also attended the conference along with other Indian dignitaries.

== With Prince Krishnakumarsinhji ==
Before his death, Bhavsinhji II had requested Pattani to look after his young son and instill similar values in him, which Pattani did until Prince Krishna Kumarsinhji Bhavsinhji became King in 1931.

== Personality ==
Pattani was a generous donor, donating most of his money to those in need. Once a person asked him: "You are a good friend of Gandhiji and you always try to imbibe many of his qualities. But Gandhiji has a different stake in giving donation or alms. He does not give anything to such people but asks them to stop begging and start working. However, you don't ask such people to work but only give whatever they ask. Aren't you making more beggars in society?"

Pattani replied: "We cannot forget that Mahatma Gandhi has donated all his money, time and life for the betterment of society. He is the ultimate donor. Such a big donor that he has donated whatever he had and didn't keep anything for himself or family. He does not earn. However, I earn, and if I can help someone, I should always give. I also tell them to work but when someone comes with a broken heart and an empty stomach, I cannot tell them to find work if I, myself cannot generally work for them."

Pattani had deep love and respect for all living beings. He loved animals – especially cows – and liked to tend them and feed them as much as he could. During World War I Pattani was part of England's Indian minister council. One Sunday, England's King George V participated in mass church prayers while Pattani and other ministers were present. The prayer was: "O God! Destroy our enemies and make us win the war". Edwin Samuel Montagu asked Pattani whether he liked this prayer. Pattani replied: "I might be praying the same. The God to whom you, me, Germans and others are praying is a father of all of us." Montagu asked him what would be his prayer. Pattani replied: "O God ! Give us the consciousness that we all stay together and help each other." One person said: "The prayer is indeed good but during wartime, we can not pray like this." For that, he replied: "I am sorry but during wartime, this has to be the prayer inside us. That is the only real prayer."

== Honours ==
As Diwan of Bhavnagar, Pattani was invested as a Companion of the Order of the Indian Empire (CIE) on the British Imperial 1910 New Year Honours list, and was made Knight Commander of the Order of the Indian Empire (KCIE) in the 1915 Birthday Honours list.

== Death and legacy ==
Pattani gave up his position in the State Council in December 1937. He died in 1938 as a result of cardiac arrest.
