= Bochadva =

Bochdavea is a village in Umrala Taluka of Bhavnagar district in Gujarat, India.

== History ==
During the British period, Bochadva was under Bhavnagar State and was under Gadhda mahal.

The population according to the census of 1872 was 239 and according to that of 1881, 202 souls. The approximate population in 1970 was 750. The approximate population in 2000 was 1250. The approximate population in 2020 was 1580, including approximately 600 moved to Bhavnagar, Surat, Bombay, Rajkot, Ahmedabad.
