= Chinoy (surname) =

Chinoy is the surname of the following people

- Helen Krich Chinoy (1922–2010), American theater historian
- Sharmeen Obaid-Chinoy (born 1978), Pakistani journalist and filmmaker
- Sujan R. Chinoy, Indian diplomat
- Usha Chinoy (1929–2004), Indian educationist and musician
- Alisha Chinoy, Indian Singer
