= Kishor Parekh =

Indian photojournalist

Kishor Parekh (1930-1982) was an Indian photojournalist. He was born in Bhavnagar, Gujarat, and studied filmmaking and documentary photography at the University of Southern California. His work as a student won him numerous awards. He returned to India from 1960 to 1961 and became the chief photographer of the Hindustan Times. In this capacity, he covered the Sino-Indian war of 1962 and the 1965 conflict between India and Pakistan. He was awarded a gold medal by Soviet Land for his coverage of the Tashkent summit that marked the conclusion of the war. He covered the 1966-1967 famine in Bihar, and his photographs on this subject were exhibited in the United States. He also shot Prime Minister Jawaharlal Nehru until the latter's death in 1964.

After six years at the Hindustan Times, Parekh joined the Asia Magazine in Hong Kong in 1967. He travelled throughout the Asia Pacific region on assignment. Later on, he became photo editor of Pacific Magazines Ltd, a position he held till about 1972. Afterwards, he returned to Bombay.

Parekh is best known for his work on the Bangladesh Liberation War of 1971. His book on the subject, Bangladesh: A Brutal Birth, was a covered the atrocities committed by the Pakistani forces and the suffering of the native Bengali population. According to photographer Pablo Bartholomew: "Bangladesh was Kishor’s highest point. Self-assigned, self-funded, driven by his own instincts, emotions and guts, in a two-week period he produced a startling set of images that became a powerful book and statement." The Indian government commissioned 20,000 copies of the book to raise awareness of the war.

Parekh's work appeared in numerous national and international publications including National Geographic, Paris Match, Sunday Times, Time magazine, Stern, Popular Photography and Asahi Graphic. He died of a heart attack in 1982 while on assignment in the Himalayas. Upon his death, his 16-year-old son Swapan Parekh became a photographer.

Kishor was married to Saroj Parekh.
