= Krishna Kumarsinhji Bhavsinhji =

Last ruling Maharaja of Bhavnagar from 1919–1948

Krishnakumarsinh Gohil
- KCSI; Colonel Raol Sir

Maharaja of Bhavnagar State
- Reign: 1919 - 1948
- Successor: Virbhadrasinhji Krishna Kumarsinhji
- Born: 19 May 1912; Bhavnagar
- Died: 2 April 1965 (aged 52)
- Spouse: Maharani Vijayabakunverba Sahiba
Regnal name
- Colonel Maharaja Raol Sir Krishna Kumarsinhji Gohil KCSI
- House: Gohil dynasty

Governor of Madras state
- In office 7 September 1948 – 12 March 1952
- Preceded by: Archibald Nye
- Succeeded by: Sri Prakasa

Colonel Maharaja Raol Sir Krishna Kumarsinhji Gohil KCSI (19 May 1912 – 2 April 1965) was an Indian politician and the last ruling Maharaja of the Gohil dynasty, who ruled Bhavnagar State from 1919 to 1948 and also served as the first Indian Governor of Madras from 1948 to 1952.

== Early life ==
Krishna Kumarsinhji was born in Bhavnagar on 19 May 1912, the eldest son and heir of Maharaja Bhavsinhji II of Bhavnagar (1875–1919, r. 1896–1919). Kumarsinhji succeeded his father upon his death in 1919; only seven years old, he ascended the Bhavnagar throne under a regency until 1931. He was educated at Rajkumar College, Rajkot like his father and grandfather, who was the first student in 1870.

== Reign ==
Kumarsinhji continued the progressive reforms of his father and grandfather, reforming the method of tax-collection in his state, introducing village councils and Bhavnagar's first legislature, the Dharasabha. Owing to his progressive reign, Kumarsinhji was knighted with the KCSI in 1938; however, he remained quietly committed to the cause of Indian independence. Therefore, upon Independence in 1947, Kumarsinhji became among the first of the Indian monarchs to accede to the Dominion of India in 1947. He merged Bhavnagar into the state of Kathiawad in 1948.

Maharaja Shri Bhavsinhji Polytechnic Institute was established by him in commemoration of his father Late Sir Bhavsinhji II in 1932, which commenced functioning in 1949.

== Personal life ==
In 1931, Kumarsinhji married Rajkumari Vijayaba Jadeja (19 June 1910 – 6 October 1990), the daughter of Thakur Sahib Bhojirajsinhji of Gondal and granddaughter of Maharaja Bhagvatsinh of Gondal. The couple had two sons and three daughters:

1. Rajkumar Virbhadra Sinh Gohil (14 March 1932 – 26 July 1994) who succeeded as Maharaja of Bhavnagar. His son, Vijayrajsinh Gohil, is the present Titular Maharaja of Bhavnagar
2. Rajkumar Shivbhadra Sinh Gohil (23 December 1933 – 31 May 2024)
3. Rajkumari Hansaba (b. 25 July 1941) (now the Titular Rajmata of Ajaygarh)
4. Rajkumari Dilharba (b. 19 November 1942) (now the Titular Maharani of Panna)
5. Rajkumari Rohiniba (b. 8 October 1945) (now the Titular Maharani of Kutch)

== Later years ==
In 1948, he worked as acting Rajpramukh of United State of Kathiawar for a brief period. Later, in 1948, Kumarsinhji became the first Indian Governor of Madras state, which included the area then partitioned to Tamil Nadu, Kerala and parts of neighbouring states of Andhra Pradesh and Karnataka serving until 1952. Also, in that year Kumarsinhji was made an honorary Commodore in the Royal Indian Navy. From 1948 until 1952, Kumarsinhji also served as the President of the Shree Nandkunverba Kshatriya Kanya Vidhyalaya and as Vice-Patron of the United Service Institution of India. Krishna Kumarsinhji Bhavsinhji died at Bhavnagar on 2 April 1965, aged 52 after a reign of 46 years. He was succeeded as Maharaja of Bhavnagar by his eldest son, Virbhadrasinhji Krishna Kumarsinhji.

== Titles ==
- 1912-1919: Maharajkumar Shri Krishna Kumarsinhji Bhavsinhji Sahib Gohil, Yuvraj Sahib of Bhavnagar
- 1919-1937: His Highness Maharaja Raol Shri Krishna Kumarsinhji Bhavsinhji Sahib, Maharaja of Bhavnagar
- 1937-1938: Lieutenant His Highness Maharaja Raol Shri Krishna Kumarsinhji Bhavsinhji Sahib, Maharaja of Bhavnagar
- 1938-1943: Lieutenant His Highness Maharaja Raol Shri Sir Krishna Kumarsinhji Bhavsinhji Sahib, Maharaja of Bhavnagar, KCSI
- 1943-1945: Captain His Highness Maharaja Raol Shri Sir Krishna Kumarsinhji Bhavsinhji Sahib, Maharaja of Bhavnagar, KCSI
- 1945-1946: Lieutenant-Colonel His Highness Maharaja Raol Shri Sir Krishna Kumarsinhji Bhavsinhji Sahib, Maharaja of Bhavnagar, KCSI
- 1946-1948: Colonel His Highness Maharaja Raol Shri Sir Krishna Kumarsinhji Bhavsinhji Sahib, Maharaja of Bhavnagar, KCSI
- 1948-1965: Commodore His Highness Maharaja Raol Shri Sir Krishna Kumarsinhji Bhavsinhji Sahib, Maharaja of Bhavnagar, KCSI
- 1948-1952: Commodore His Excellency Shri Sir Krishna Kumarsinhji Bhavsinhji Gohil, Governor of Madras State, KCSI

== Honours ==
(ribbon bar, as it would look today)

=== Decorations and medals ===
- King George V Silver Jubilee Medal-1935
- King George VI Coronation Medal-1937
- Knight Commander of the Order of the Star of India (KCSI)-1938
- War Medal 1939-1945-1945
- Defence Medal-1945
- India Service Medal - 1945
- Indian Independence Medal-1947

=== Hon. military ranks ===
- Hon. Colonel, Indian Army - 18 January 1951
- Hon. Commodore, Indian Navy - 18 January 1951

=== University ===
Bhavnagar University is now known as the Maharaja Krishnakumarsinhji Bhavnagar University

Bhavnagar Marketing yard also given the name of Maharaja Krishnakumarsinhji.

== Political office ==
Krishna Kumarsinhji Bhavsinhji Gohil dynasty Born: 19 May 1912 Died: 2 April 1965
Regnal titles
Preceded by Bhavsinhji II	Maharaja of Bhavnagar; 1919-1948	Succeeded by Monarchy abolished (Merge within the Dominion of India)
Titles in pretence
Preceded by none	— TITULAR — Maharaja of Bhavnagar; 1948-65	Succeeded by Virbhadrasinhji
