= Takhtsinhji =

Maharaja of Bhavnagar from 1870–1896

- Maharaja Raol Sir Takhtsinhji Jaswantsinhji
- Reign: 1870 to 1896
- Born: 6 January 1858
- Died: 29 January 1896 (aged 38)
- Father: Jaswantsinhji

Maharaja Raol Sir Takhtsinhji Jaswantsinhji GCSI KIH (6 January 1858 – 29 January 1896), was Maharaja of Bhavnagar, a Rajput chief of the Gohil clan, and ruler of Bhavnagar state in Kathiawar. He succeeded to the throne of Bhavnagar upon the death of his father, Jaswantsinhji, in 1870.

== Life ==
Takhtsinhji attended the Delhi Durbar in 1877. During his minority studies, which ended on 5 April 1878, he was educated at the Rajkumar College, Rajkot being the first student. Afterward, he studied under an English officer, while the administration of the state was conducted jointly by Mr. E. H. Percival, a member of the Indian Civil Service, and Gaurishankar Udayshankar, C.S.I., one of the foremost native statesmen of India, who had served the state in various capacities since 1822.

At the age of twenty, Takhtsinhji found himself the ruler of a territory nearly 3,000 square miles (7,800 km^{2}) in size. His first public act was to sanction a railway connecting his territory with one of the main trunk lines, which was the first enterprise of its kind on the part of a raja in western (if not all) India. The amount of commerce, trade, economic and social development of the state that came in the wake of this railway confirmed Takhtsinhji as supporting a policy of progressive administration. Further educational establishments, hospitals, dispensaries, trunk roads, bridges, handsome edifices, and other public works projects followed.

Takhtsinhji was awarded the Empress of India Gold Medal in 1877, and knighted as a KCSI in 1881. In 1886, he inaugurated a system of constitutional rule, by placing several departments in the hands of four members of a council of state under his own presidency. This innovation—which had the support of the governor of Bombay, Lord Reay—provoked a virulent attack upon the chief, who brought his defamers to trial at the High Court of Bombay. The punishment of the ringleaders broke up a blackmailing system to which rajas were regularly exposed. The public spirit toward Takhtsinhji in freeing his brother chiefs from blackmail was widely acknowledged throughout India, as well as by the British authorities.

In 1886, he was promoted to GCSI, and five years later his hereditary title of Thakur was raised to that of Maharaja. In 1893 he took advantage of the opening of the Imperial Institute to visit England in order to pay personal homage to Queen Victoria, then sovereign of the British Empire. During that occasion, the University of Cambridge awarded him the degree of LL.D.

As the first pupil of Rajkumar College, Rajkot, Takhtsinhji became its greatest patron and benefactor following his accession to the throne of Bhavnagar. He was also a great benefactor to Gujarat College, Fergusson College, and the Wadhwan Girassia School, as well as several girls' and women's schools. He founded Samaldas Arts College in 1885, which he named after the later Diwan of State, Samaldas Mehta. During his reign, he undertook intensive developments, reformed the revenue department, erected water works and modern docks, extended medical relief, built a port, bridges, hospitals, and schools and worked to and modernize Bhavnagar. He died at the Moti Bagh Palace on 29 January 1896 at the age of 38. He was succeeded as Maharaja of Bhavnagar by his eldest son, Bhavsinhji II.

== Titles ==
Over his life, Takhtsinhji was known by the following titles:

- 1858–1870: Maharajkumar Shri Takhtsinhji Jaswantsinhji Sahib Gohil, Yuvraj Sahib of Bhavnagar
- 1870–1877: His Highness Maharaj Raol Shri Takhtsinhji Jaswantsinhji Sahib, Maharaj Raol Thakore Sahib of Bhavnagar
- 1877–1881: His Highness Maharaj Raol Shri Takhtsinhji Jaswantsinhji Sahib, Maharaj Raol Thakore Sahib of Bhavnagar, KIH
- 1881–1886: His Highness Maharaj Raol Shri Sir Takhtsinhji Jaswantsinhji Sahib, Maharaj Raol Thakore Sahib of Bhavnagar, KCSI, KIH
- 1886–1891: His Highness Maharaj Raol Shri Sir Takhtsinhji Jaswantsinhji Sahib, Maharaj Raol Thakore Sahib of Bhavnagar, GCSI, KIH

== Honors ==
During his lifetime, Takhtsinhji received the following honors:

- Prince of Wales gold medal: 1875
- Empress of India Gold Medal: 1877
- Knight Grand Commander of the Order of the Star of India (GCSI): 1886 (KCSI: 1881)
- Personal title of Maharaja: 1891
