= Sujan R. Chinoy =

Indian diplomat

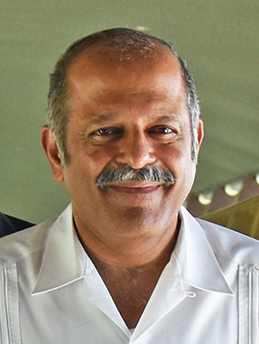

Director General, Manohar Parrikar Institute for Defense Studies and Analyses
- Incumbent
- Assumed office 2019

Ambassador of India to Japan and the Marshall Islands
- In office 2015–2018

Ambassador of India to Mexico and High Commissioner to Belize
- In office 2012–2015

Personal details
- Born: 27 September 1958 (68 years)
- Occupation: Civil Servant (Indian Foreign Service)

Sujan R. Chinoy (born 1958) is a former Indian diplomat and the Director General of the Manohar Parrikar Institute for Defence Studies and Analyses (MP-IDSA), an Indian think tank in New Delhi, funded by the Ministry of Defence. He retired from the Indian Foreign Service on 30 September 2018 after a professional diplomatic career spanning more than 37 years with experience in China, East Asia, the Asia-Pacific region, the United Nations, National Security, and the Latin American region. He held the rank of Grade I Ambassador and was a member of the Padma Awards selection committee between 2022-2024.

== Career ==
=== Ambassador to Japan ===
He was the Indian Ambassador to Japan from 2015 to 2018. He served as the Indian Ambassador to the Republic of the Marshall Islands. His tenure coincided with high level diplomatic visits in 2015, 2016, 2017 and 2018. Significant developments occurred under his leadership, including the foundation-stone ceremony of the Shinkansen (Bullet Train/Mumbai Ahmedabad High-Speed Rail) project, the Civil Nuclear Cooperation Agreement, the establishment of Japanese vocational training centers in India (Japan India Institutes of Manufacturing, or "JIMs"), the integration of young Indian professionals into Japanese companies through Japan's Technical Intern Training Programme (TITP), and collaborations in various sectors such as healthcare, digital technologies, start-ups, agriculture etc. India has been the largest recipient of Japanese ODA loans since 2003–04, with those investments having a presence in manufacturing, financial markets, logistics, and start-ups.

=== Other appointments ===
Chinoy served as Indian Ambassador to Mexico and High Commissioner of India to Belize from 2012 to 2015. He served on deputation to the National Security Council Secretariat from 2008 to 2012 as Joint Secretary. He also served in Indian Consul General's office in China (Shanghai, 2000-2005) and Australia (Sydney), handling trade and economic portfolios.

== Early life ==
Chinoy was born to Romeshchandra Chinoy, and Usha Chinoy (née Joshi), a well-known musician, social worker, and educationist. Usha Chinoy's grandfather, Vaidya Shastri Manishankar Govindji (Maṇicaṅkar Kōvintaji), founded the Ayurveda firm Atank Nigrah Pharmacy in Jamnagar in 1881. Chinoy's paternal grandfather, Barrister C. N. Chinoy, served as Dewan of Rajkot State; (a 1940 India Office file records his resignation and the appointment of N. N. Anklesaria in his place), after whom a road in Rajkot was renamed as "Barrister Chinoy Road" post independence. Chinoy has two sisters, Dr. Parasmani Acharya and Dr. Mala R. Chinoy.

== Education ==
Chinoy received his education at Rajkumar College, Rajkot (1965–74). He completed his BA (Hons.) in English Literature and Psychology, along with a Diploma in German from Maharaja Sayajirao University of Baroda. Additionally, he obtained his MBA in Marketing from B.K. School of Business Management, Gujarat University, Ahmedabad. While at the university, Chinoy was a Senior Under Officer in the Infantry Wing of the National Cadet Corps and completed his "C" Certificate, including a special high-altitude ski course at the Indian Institute of Skiing and Mountaineering in Gulmarg. He participated in the All India Inter-University Rifle Shooting Championship held in Chennai in 1976. He joined the Indian Foreign Service in 1981.

He is fluent in Chinese (Mandarin) and He studied Putonghua at the Chinese Language Centre of the Chinese University of Hong Kong (1983–84). He also knows French, German, Japanese, Arabic, Spanish and French Creole, as well as Gujarati, Hindi, and Urdu. He was an exchange student at the Otemon Gakuin University in Osaka, Japan, in 1978.

== Other achievements ==
Chinoy organised the largest gathering of yoga enthusiasts outside of India for the event marking International Yoga Day on 21 June 2015 in Mexico City, which witnessed about 6,000 participants on the broad Reforma Avenue. He gave a sitar performance on 2 October 2013, playing Mahatma Gandhi's favourite bhajans to mark Gandhi Jayanti in Mexico City. He has performed a cameo role in a Gujarati film titled Sorath No Sinh Chelbhai.

== Controversies in MP-IDSA ==
In his tenure, as DG MP-IDSA, Sujan R. Chinoy had been found in possession of a Canteen Smart Card (CSD) despite neither he nor any employee of the Institute being authorized to possess one. According to the RTI reply from Ministry of Defence (MoD), which brought this controversy to light, “Sujan Chinoy is not eligible for canteen facilities.” while stating that the current Director-General (D-G) Sujan R. Chinoy was issued a card “erroneously”. Sources familiar with the matter disclosed that the CSD card had been “hotlisted,” effectively blocking or canceling it.

A PIL (Public Interest Litigation) was filed against the appointment of DG MP-IDSA in the Delhi High Court on the grounds that he was nominated and not selected by a search-cum-selection committee which should mandatorily include at least one outside expert of eminence from the field. The Delhi High Court found the PIL to not be maintainable and thus dismissed it.
