= Nazir Dekhaiya =

Gujarati language poet from India

Noor Mohammad Allah Rakha 'Nazir' Dekhaiya
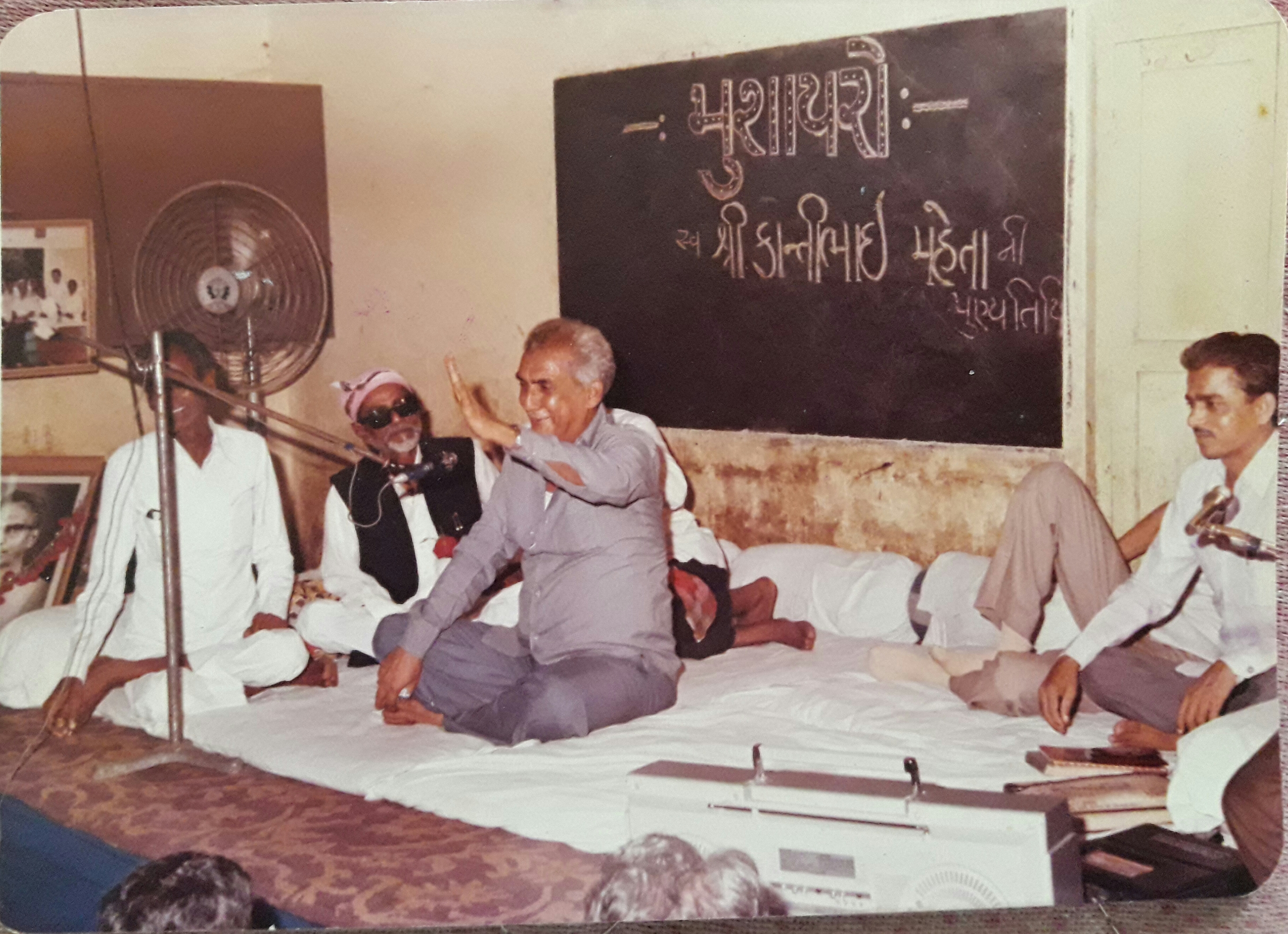
- Born: Noor Muhammad Allah Rakha Dekhaiya; 13 February 1921; Bhavnagar, British India
- Died: 16 March 1988 (aged 67); Bhavnagar, Gujarat, India
- Resting place: Bhavnagar
- Occupation: Poet
- Spouse: Halima Bai
- Writing career
- Pen name: Nazir
- Language: Gujarati
- Genre: Ghazal
- Notable works: Tushar (1962); Soona Sadan (2013)

Noor Mohammad Allah Rakha Dekhaiya, better known by his takhallus Nazir Dekhaiya, was a Gujarati ghazal poet from Gujarat, India. His ghazal collections include Tushar (1962), Nazirni Ghazalo (parts 1–2) and Soona Sadan (2006).

== Biography ==
He was born on 13 February 1921 in Bhavnagar to Allah Rakha Bhai and his second wife Dhan Bai. His father was a Bandmaster. He lost his parents during his childhood. He studied until 4th standard. He learned Clarinet and started to work in family-owned India Abhu Band as a bandmaster. His brothers died soon after and he became responsible for the rest of his family. In order to strengthen his finances, he joined the District Panchayat Board, Bhavnagar in 1956 as a peon where he served until retirement.

He died after contracting bronchopneumonia on 16 March 1988 in Bhavnagar.

== Works ==
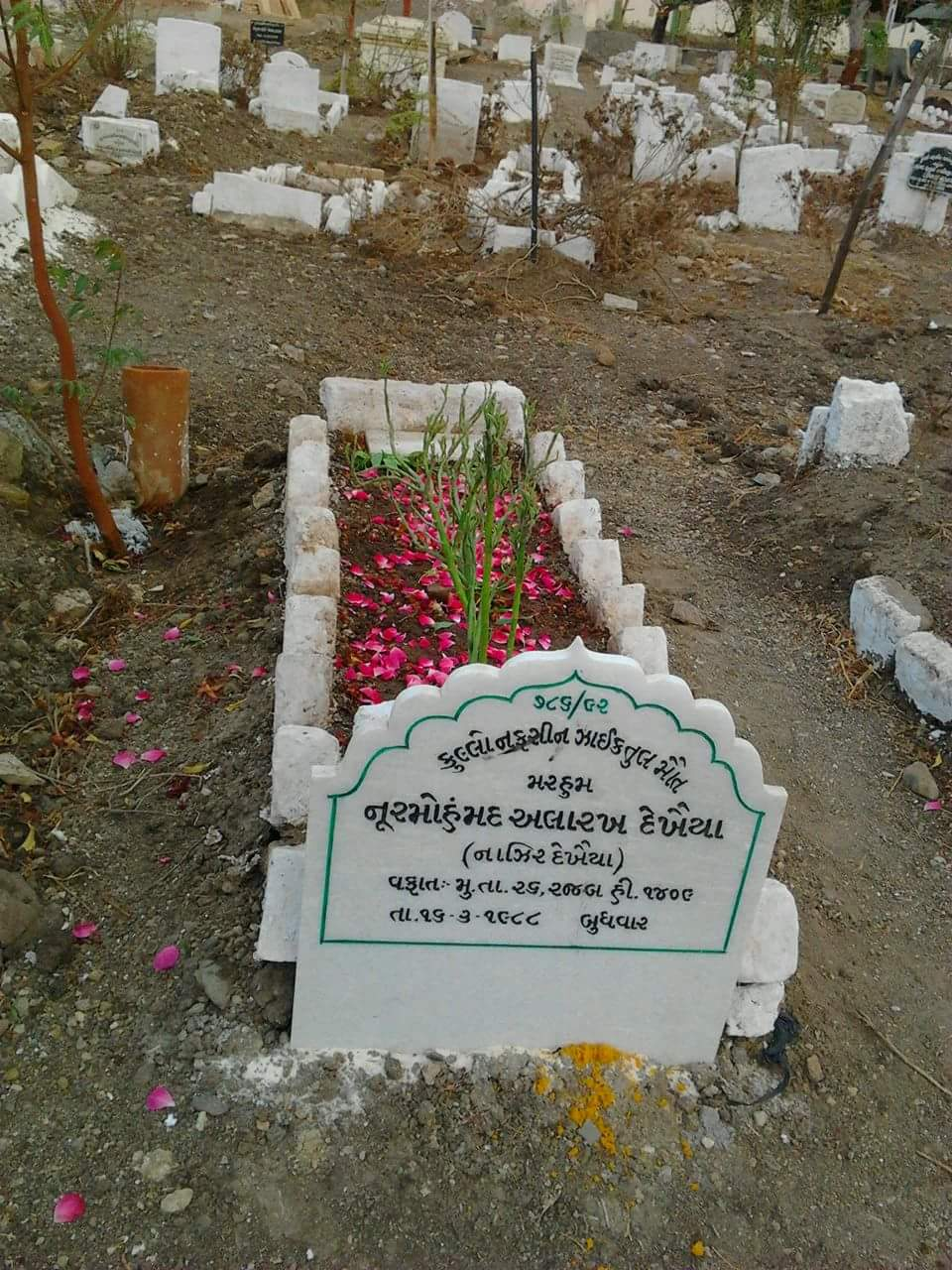
Grave of Poet Nazir Dekhaiya

He used to participate in Ghazalsabha, a literary meeting in Bhavnagar where he became acquainted with other poets including Kismat Qureshi, Barkat Virani, Ruswa Majhalumi, Vali Lakhani and Batuk Pandya. He studied ghazal under Kismat Qureshi. Tushar, his first ghazal collection which contains 54 ghazals, was published in 1962 and was followed by Tushar-2 (1978), Nazirni Ghazalo (Part 1-2) and Soona Sadan (2013). His ghazals mainly center around Sufism, the worship of God and talking with loved ones. His ghazal Gaganvasi was sung by Manhar Udhas.

His short biography was published by his granddaughter, Sameera Dekhaiya Patrawala and grandson Firdaus Dekhaiya in October 2016.

== Personal life ==
His father Allah Rakha Bhai married twice. He had two sons; Jamal (later "Bebas" Dekhaiya who was also a poet) and Qadar from his first wife Hoor Bai. After the death of Hoor Bai, he married Dhan Bai who gave birth to Rahim and Noor Muhammad (later 'Nazir'). Nazir was raised by his stepbrother, Jamal, and his stepbrother's wife, Hawwa Bai. He married Halima Bai. Their two daughters died at an early age. He had three sons and three daughters.

== See also ==
- List of Gujarati-language writers
