= Usha Chinoy =

Indian educationist and musician

Usha Chinoy performing in 1969.

Usha Chinoy (1929–2004) was an Indian educationist and musician from Rajkot, Gujarat.

== Early life and education ==
Usha Chinoy (née Joshi) was born in the former princely state of Jamnagar (Nawanagar) in the Kathiawar peninsula (Saurashtra) of Gujarat to Trambaklal Manishankar Joshi and Yashomati Joshi. She completed her BA (Hons.) at the Dharmendrasinhji College in Rajkot. She later also obtained a diploma in music through the Sangeet Visharad and Hindustani Vineet degrees. In the city of Jamnagar, she was the first elected female member of the municipal corporation and also Principal of the Sajuba Girls High School from the late 1940s till the early 1950s. Her grandfather, poet and author Vaidya Shastri Manishankar Govindji, founded the famous Atank Nigrah pharmacy, an Ayurvedic firm of great repute, in Jamnagar in 1881. The firm had branches in Bombay (Mumbai), Calcutta (Kolkata), Madras (Chennai), Poona (Pune), Karachi, Colombo, Rangoon (Yangon), Penang and Singapore.

== Career ==
Usha commenced her singing career in the 1940s with songs recorded for Young India. Her repertoire on All India Radio and later on the TV channel Doordarshan during the 1960s and 1980s included Gujarati and Urdu ghazals, bhajans, thumris, Gujarati folk songs and light music. She was also a playback singer for Gujarati films. From 1964 to 1974, she was the founding head of the Department of Arts, Crafts and Music and teacher at the Rajkumar College, Rajkot. In 1967 she went to the United States as part of the Experiment in International Living program.

== Personal life ==
Usha was married to senior Indian Police Service officer Romeshchandra Chinoy (1925–1991). Her elder sibling, Suresh T. Joshi, was the principal of the Gujarat Ayurveda College in Jamnagar in the 1960s and 1970s. Usha was the daughter-in-law of barrister C. N. Chinoy, Dewan of the former princely state of Rajkot. She died in 2004 in Shanghai, China, and was survived by her three children, one of whom, Sujan R. Chinoy, was appointed Indian Ambassador to Mexico, and by five grandchildren.
