= Gohil dynasty =

Indian ruling family in Gujarat

The Gohil dynasty or Gohil or Guhilas of Saurashtra is a Rajput dynasty who ruled parts of Saurashtra region of present-day Gujarat state of India as subordinates or independents starting in the 12th century. They later moved to the east coast where they established themselves and the region came to be known as Gohilwar, which included the princely states of Bhavnagar, Palitana, Lathi, Vala, and Rajpipla, and ruled until India gained independence in 1947.

== Origin ==
Predecessor state of Sejakpur founded in 1194 (or 1240 or 1260), then the capitals were at Ranipur 1254/1309, Umrala or Gogha 1309/1445, Umrala 1445/1570, Shihor 1570/1723 then finally Bhavnagar from 1723. The Gohils claim to be descended from the celebrated Ram, who belonged to the Solar dynasty or Suryavanshi race, and so trace their line from the celebrated Shalivahan of Guhila of Mewar, (Col. James Tod Also makes them of the solar race). The old family title of Rawal or Raol was earned at the memorable battle of Chittor, fought with Alauddin Khilji in 1303. The state motto is "Man Proposes but God disposes" on a label azure. The state arms are Gules, an eagle or displayed, in chief on a canton of the second, a lion statant of the first.

Traditionally, Gohils trace their origin to the king named Shalivahana. D. R. Bhandarkar, C. V. Vaidya and Gaurishankar Oza have established origin of Gohils with Guhila dynasty of Medapata (Guhilots of Mewar). This Shalivahana is identified with Shalivahana, the Guhila king of Medapata. He mentioned in Atpur (Ahar) inscription of his son Shaktikumara dated 977 CE (VS 1034). He is sometimes misidentified with Shalivahana of south who is sometimes associated with Saka Era. Guhilas considered themselves as Suryavanshi (of solar race).

== Gohil inscriptions ==
Find spots of inscriptions mentioning Gohil dynasty

=== Mangrol stone inscription ===
The Mangrol stone inscription of the Guhila Thakkura Muluka was found engraved on a slab of black stone affixed to the wall of a stepwell in the town of Mangrol, near Junagadh. It is the earliest known epigraph of Gohil dynasty and is dated 15 October 1145 CE. The inscription has 25 lines, beginning with Om Namah Sivay and an invocation to Hara (Shiva). It then praises Chaulukya king Kumarapala, successor of Jayasimha Siddharaja and refers to Guhila family: Sahara, his son Sahajiga, who was an army commander (anga-niguhaka) of the Chaulukyas; his eldest son Muluka, who was protector of Saurashtra (Saurashtraraksh-kshama and Saurashtra-nayaka); his younger brother Somaraja, who built a Maheshwara (Shiva) temple at Somnath and named it Sahajigeshwara to honour his father. The inscription is composed by the Pashupata teacher Prasarvajna.

Ancestry tree of Guhilas mentioned in Mangrol inscriptions
- Sahara
  - Sahajiga
    - Mulaka (1145 CE)
    - Somaraja

=== Ghelana inscription ===
This inscription was found in the Kamanatha Mahadeva temple in Ghelana village near Mangrol. It is dated Vallabhi year 911 (1229 CE). It mentions Ranaka Rana(???), son of Thakur Mulu, who granted Asanapatta for worship of the god in Bhrigu Matha. Its copy is now stored in Rajkot Museum.

Thakur Mulu is probably the same Thakkura Muluka mentioned in the Mangrol stone-inscription. Based on this and Magrol inscriptions, it is known that they were ruling in the southwest region of Saurashtra, probably as the neighbour of Jethwas. It is not known why they moved to the eastern coast of Saurashtra later.

=== Parnala inscription ===
This inscription was found on pedestal of Chaturbhuj Jain image in Jain temple of Parnala village. It is dated VS 1453 (1397 CE). It says about the consecration of that image by Bhavaladevi, wife of Gohil king Pratapmalla. Nothing else is known about this king Pratapmalla.

=== Mahuva inscription ===
The sub-joined inscription in the black stone slab of the pedestral of idol of Laxmi Narayan temple near the Darbargadh of Mahuva near Bhavnagar. This Sanskrit inscription records digging of well and seem brought here from somewhere else as it does not mention the temple. It is dated VS 1500 (1444 CE). This inscription mentions Gohil king Sarangji who must have been Sarangji, son of Kanoji and ancestor of the rulers of Bhavnagar State. It also mentions a king named Rama which is not conclusively identified as Ramji, uncle of Sarangji or Vala king Ramadeva.

Raval Sarangji is also mentioned as ruler of Ghogha port in VS 1469 as a feudatory of the Delhi Sultanate in the manuscript of Vishnu Bhakti Chandrodaya.

=== Vartej inscription ===
This inscription is found on the Sati paliya (memorial stone) dated VS 1674 (1617 CE) in Vartej near Bhavnagar. It records donation by Gohil king Raval Dhunaji. Dhunaji was a son of Visoji, a Gohil chief of Sihor and ancestor of the Bhavnagar rulers. He had died fighting Kathis in 1619.

=== Halvad inscriptions ===
The inscription on paliya (memorial stone) dated VS 1722 (1666 CE) standing near 36 pillared shrine (deri) in Halvad records death of Gohil Lakhaji, son of Asaji and his wife Potbai and grandson of Gohil Chachaji, while fighting for Raja Gajasimhaji who must have been Jhala ruler who ruled from 1661 to 1673 CE. Another inscription on paliya near it mentions Gohil Vasaji, son of Karanji and his wife Jivibai and grandson of Govindji, who died in battle in fighting for Maharaja Jaswantsinhji in VS 1749 (1693 CE). Jaswantsinhji was a Jhala ruler who ruled from 1683 to 1723 CE.

=== Gundi inscription ===
A paliya in Gundi village near Ghogha has inscription dated VS 1755 (1699 CE) mentioning death of Gohil Kanoji, son Lakha, in battle a year earlier. Kanoji was successor of Vijoji, the chief of Umrala, and an ancestor of Bhavnagar rulers.

=== Lathi inscriptions ===
The inscription dated VS 1808 (1752 CE) in the Bhidbhanjan Mahadeva temple in Lathi mentions construction of the temple during reign of Gohil Shrisimhaji. Another inscription on the pedestal of the image of Ganesha mentions its consecration during reign of Gohil Lakhaji in VS 1820 (1763 CE). These who rulers must be ancestors of rulers of Lathi State.

== History ==
=== Early Gohils ===
==== Mohadasa ====
It is said that a descendant of Salivahana settled in Khera-gadh on the banks of Luni river in the Jodhpur State. The last prince of Khera, Mohadasa, was killed by Siaji, grandson of the Rathod ruler 'Jayacandra' of Kanauj, according to the tradition.

==== Sejakji ====
Traditions say that Mohadasa's grandson, Sejakji (1194–1254 CE or 1240–1290 CE), migrated to Saurashtra about VS 1250 and entered in service of Chudasama king Mahipala ruling from Junagadh. He obtained 12 villages around Sapur and from his progeny descended the Gohils of Saurashtra and other regions. According to Bardic accounts, he entered in service of another Chudasama king Kavat and had his daughter Valamkunvarba married to Khengar, son of Kavat. Kavat gave him a grant of Shahpur and surrounding twelve villages in Panchal (central Sairashtra). Sejakji's sons Shahji and Saranji obtained Mandvi Chovisi and Arthila Chovisi due to interests of their sister Valamkunvarba. The rulers of Palitana State and Lathi State traces their ancestry to these two brothers. James W. Watson, in Gazetteer of the Bombay Presidency: Kathiawar Volume VIII (1884) had given VS 1290 and reason as their rivalry with Rathods. Sejakji is reported to have established new village named Sejakpur and won several villages surrounding it.

Based on Mangrol stone-inscription, Muluka was a feudatory chief under Chaulukya king Kumarapala. Gaurishankar Oza identifies his father Sahajiga with Sejakji. He suggests that Sahajiga had first migrated from Luni valley and took service under Chaulukya king Siddharaja Jayasimha. He had participated as a commander of Chaulukya forces in his war against Saurashtra and thus he was later appointed as a chief of Saurashtra. H. C. Ray agrees with suggestion citing Muluka mentioned in the inscription as the protector of Saurashtra.

==== Ranaji and Visoji ====
The statue of Ranaji

Ranaji/Ranoji (1254–1309 CE or 1290–1309 CE), descendant of Sejakji, established Ranpur and moved their capital to it. With help of Koli forces of Dhanmer, he captured Vala (Vallabhipur). It is told that he died in battle with forces of Ahmedabad, the capital of Gujarat Sultanate. Virbhadra Singhji has identified him as the grandson of Sejakji while other sources identify him as a son of Sejakji.

Sejakji's fifth brother Visoji married a daughter of Dhandh of Mer tribe of village Khas who was ruler of Dhandhuka. Their descendants are known as Khasiyas (Garasiya)after name of the village. Watson identifies Visoji as the son of Ranoji. They lived in Khas for fifteen generations and Aranji II moved to neighbouring Matiyala in the early eighteenth century.

==== Mokhadaji ====
Ranaji's son, Mokhadaji (1309–1347 CE) captured Bhimdad from Vala Rajput and Umrala from Kolis. Then he captured Khokhra and later Ghogha expelling Muslim Kasbati (chief). From Baria Kolis, he conquered the Piram Island in the Gulf of Cambay. He established himself there and took up piracy. This irked Delhi Sultan Muhammad bin Tughluq who was in Gujarat to quell rebellion. After hard-fought battle, he killed Mokhadaji and captured Ghogha and Piram island in 1347 CE.

According to one story, Mokhadaji had no children until he was fifty. Balansha, a Muslim saint of Karakadi, was pleased by him with sacrifice. By his grace, he had sons so he built a mosque in his honour and vowed that his descendant will offer a leather (called Budi) when they are virgin.

=== Descendant States ===
The rulers of Palitana and Lathi States trace their ancestry to Shahji and Saranji, two sons of Sejakji.

Mokhadaji's elder son Dungarji (1347–1370) fled to Und-Saravaiyawad but he was captured by the Delhi forces. He was later reinstated as a chief of Ghogha and regained his father's possession of Umrala. His successor Visoji (1370-1395) was involved in a dispute of Jani and Rana clans of Audichya Brahman landlords of Sihor. Jani clan summoned Visoji while Rana clan summoned Kandhoji Gohil of Gariadhar. Visoji defeated Kandhoji and captured Sihor. He fortified it and made it his capital. His successors were Kanoji (1395–1420 CE) and Sarangji (1420–1445 CE), Sivdasji (1445–1470 CE), Jethiji (1470–1500 CE), Ramdasji (1500–1535 CE), Sartanji (1535–1570 CE), Visoji (1570–1600 CE), Dhunaji (1600–1619 CE), Ratanji (1619–1629 CE ), Harbhamji (1620–1622 CE), Govindji (1622–1636 CE), Satrasalji (1636 CE), Akherajji II (1636–1660 CE), Ratanji II (1660–1703). His son Bhavsinhji (1703–1764) established Bhavnagar in 1722–23 and made it capital of his state moving from Sihor. Vala State was founded in 1740 by Akherajji (1764–1772 CE), son of Bhavsinhji, for his twin brother Visaji.

Mokhadaji's younger son Samarsinhji was taken to his maternal uncle Chokrana, the prince of Junaraj (old Rajpipla), of Parmar dynasty of Ujjain. As Chokrana had no heir, Samarsinhji took up a new name, Arjunsinhji and succeeded him. The rulers of Rajpipla State are his descendants.

Many small estates in Gohilwad region of Saurashtra were offshoots from the parent stem. These States and estates were continued to rule for centuries and even under the British Raj. They were merged with the Dominion of India when India became independent in 1947.
