= Government Medical College, Bhavnagar =

Medical college in Bhavnagar, Gujarat

- Type: Medical College and Hospital
- Established: 1995; 31 years ago
- Affiliations: National Medical Commission
- Academic affiliations: Maharaja Krishnakumarsinhji Bhavnagar University
- Dean: Dr. Chinmay Shah
- Location: Bhavnagar, Gujarat, India; 21°46′7″N 72°8′13″E
- Website: gmcbhavnagar.edu.in

Government Medical College, Bhavnagar is a medical college and tertiary care hospital in Bhavnagar, Gujarat, India. Established in 1995, the college offers 200 undergraduate seats and 132 postgraduate seats across 20 disciplines.

== Ragging incidents ==
The college has faced several reported incidents of ragging and harassment involving students and resident doctors. In March 2025, six doctors of the college were booked by the police for the confinement and mistreatment of three medical interns. The college's anti-ragging committee subsequently took disciplinary action against the accused.

In June 2026, another ragging incident was reported at the college involving first-year postgraduate residents in the Orthopaedics Department. Thirteen junior residents complained against harassment by senior residents. Subsequently, six resident doctors were suspended by the college administration. The Gujarat health department also imposed suspensions ranging from six months to two years on the six students found guilty in the inquiry.

Another complaint was reported in the college's Gynaecology Department in June 2026, about harassment of a student by senior students. Following the incidents, the authorities initiated stronger anti-ragging measures, including increased monitoring and security, and surprise inspections.
