= Bhavnagar State =

Princely state of India

Coordinates: 28.76°N 72.15°E

- Princely State of the British Raj
- 1723–1948
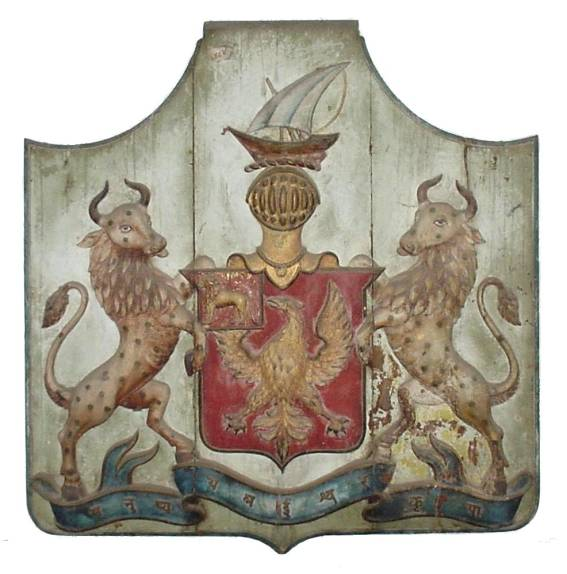
- Flag Coat of arms

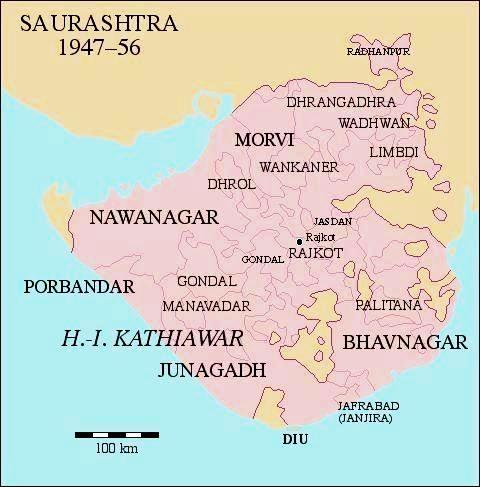
- Location of Bhavnagar State in Saurashtra
- Capital: Bhavnagar
- Area
  - 1891: 7,669 km^{2} (2,961 sq mi)
- Population
  - 1891: 464,671
- History
  - Established: 1723
  - Indian independence: 1948
Succeeded by
Saurashtra State
- This article incorporates text from a publication now in the public domain: Chisholm, Hugh, ed. (1911). "Bhaunagar". Encyclopædia Britannica (11th ed.). Cambridge University Press.

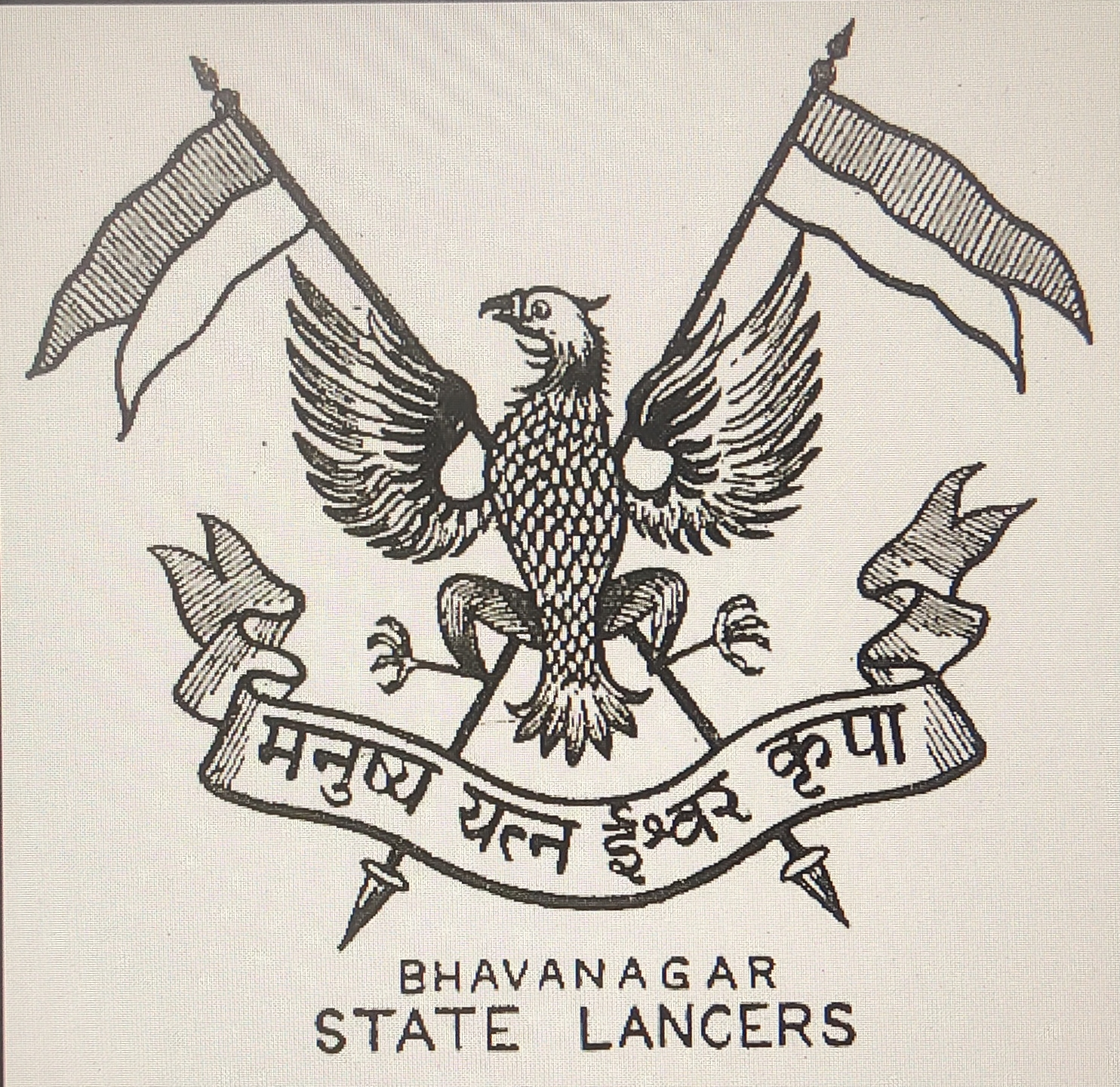
Bhavnagar Lancers Coat Of Arms

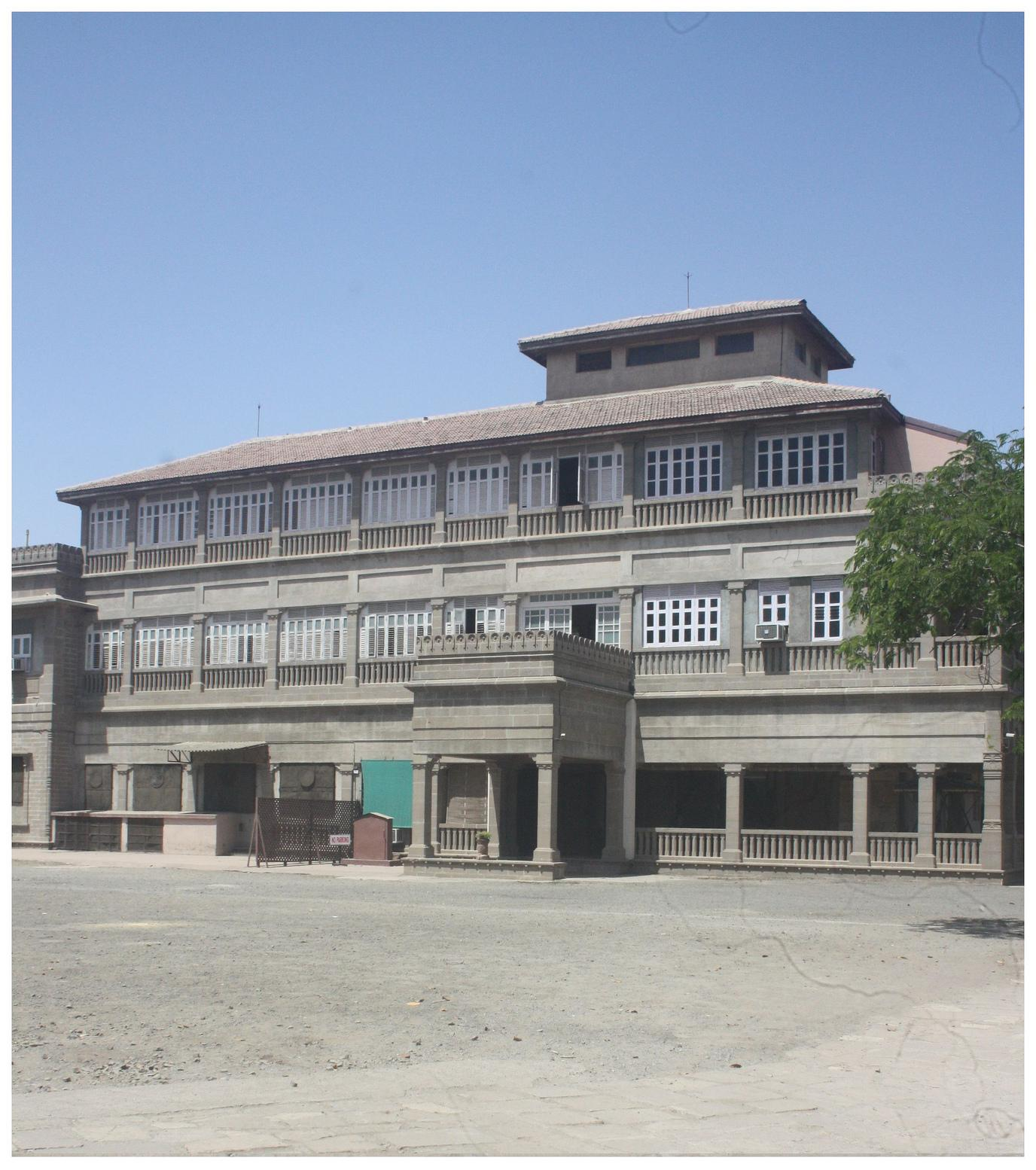
Nilambagh Palace, Bhavnagar

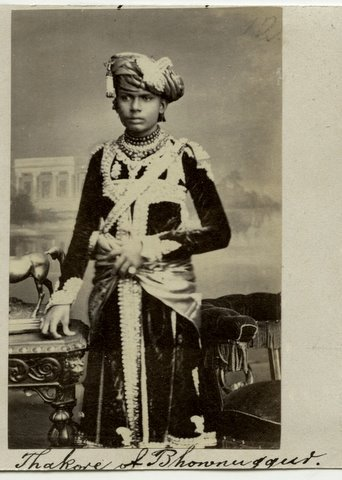
A Thakur of Bhavnagar in the 1870s

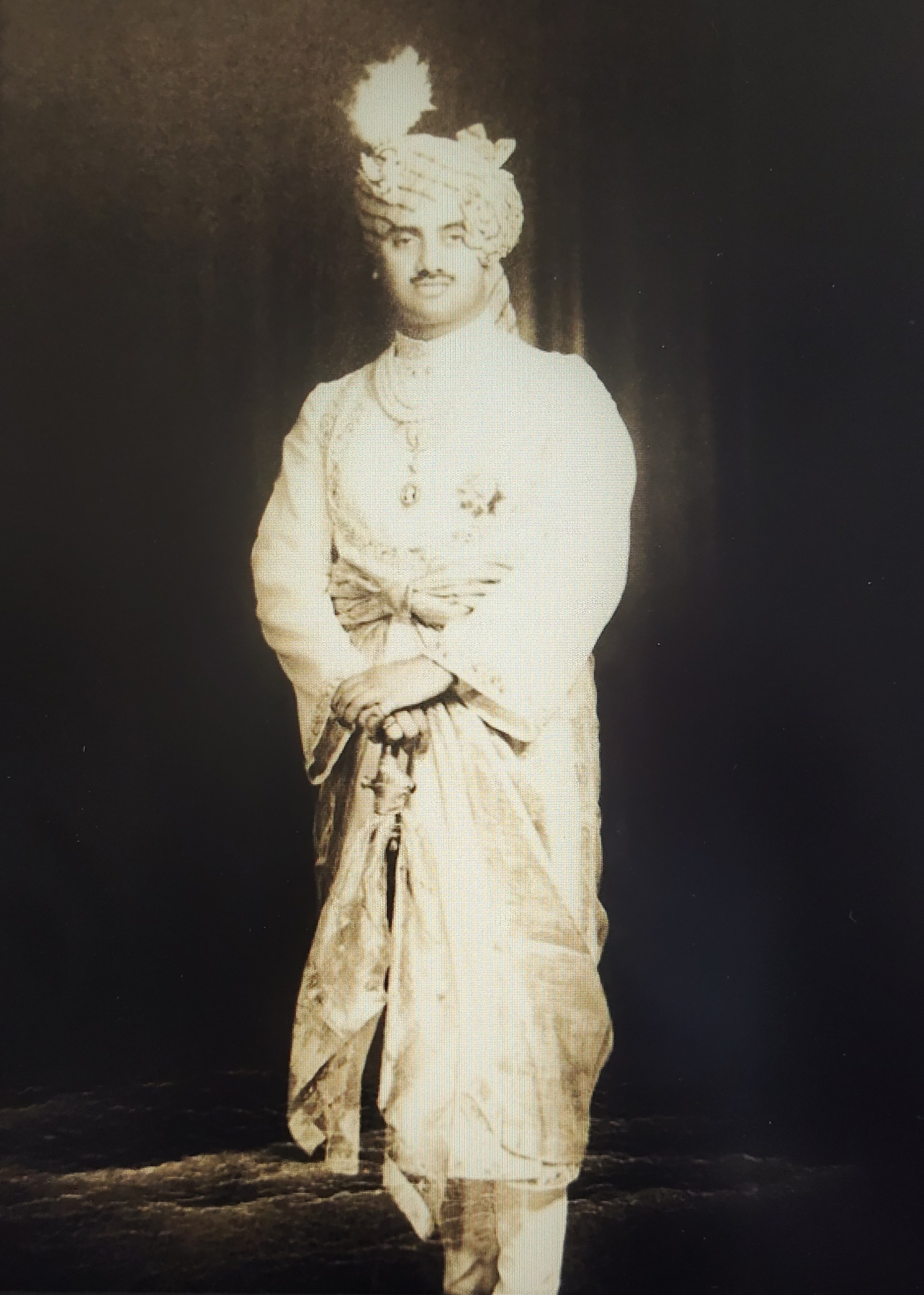
Maharaja Krishnakumarsinhji Gohil

Bhavnagar State was a princely state with 13 Gun Salutes during the British Raj. It was part of Kathiawar Agency in Saurashtra. The State of Bhavnagar covered an area of 2,961 sq. miles and had a population of 618,429 in 1941. Its ruler signed the accession to the Indian Union on 15 February 1948.

== History ==
The Gohil Rajputs faced severe competition in Marwar. Around 1260 AD, they moved down to the Gujarat coast and established three capitals; Sejakpur (present-day Ranpur), Umrala and Sihor. Sejakpur was founded in 1194.

Predecessor state of Sejakpur founded in 1194 (or 1240 or 1260), then the capitals were at Ranipur 1254/1309, Umrala or Gogha 1309/1445, Umrala 1445/1570, Shihor 1570/1723 then finally Bhavnagar from 1723. The Gohils claim to be descended from the celebrated Pandavas, who belonged to the lunar or Chandravanshi race, and so trace their line from the celebrated Shalivahan, founder of the Shaka era (Col. James Tod makes them of the solar race). The old family title of Rawal or Raol was earned at the memorable battle of Chitor, fought with Alauddin Khilji in 1303. The state motto is "Man Proposes but God disposes" on a label azure. The state arms are Gules, an eagle or displayed, in chief on a canton of the second, a lion statant of the first.

In 1722–1723, forces led by Khanthaji Kadani and Pilaji Gaekwad attempted to raid Sihor but were repelled by Maharaja Bhavsinhji Gohil. After the war Bhavsinhji realised the reason for repeated attack was the location of Sihor. In 1723, he established a new capital near Vadva village, 20 km away from Sihor, and named it Bhavnagar after himself. It was a carefully chosen strategic location because of its potential for maritime trade. Naturally, Bhavnagar became the capital of Bhavnagar State. In 1807, Bhavnagar State became a British protectorate.

The old town of Bhavnagar was a fortified town with gates leading to other important regional towns. It remained a major port for almost two centuries, trading commodities with Mozambique, Zanzibar, Singapore, and the Persian Gulf.

Bhavsinhji ensured that Bhavnagar benefited from the revenue that was brought in from maritime trade, which was monopolised by Surat and Cambay. As the castle of Surat was under the control of the Sidis of Janjira, Bhavsinhji brokered an agreement with them, giving the Sidis 1.25% of the revenue by Bhavnagar port. Bhavsinhji entered into a similar agreement with the British when they took over Surat in 1856. Whilst Bhavsinhji was in power, Bhavnagar grew from a small chieftainship to a considerably important state. This was due to the addition of new territories as well as the income provided by maritime trade. Bhavsinhji's successors continued to encourage maritime trade through Bhavnagar port, recognising its importance to the state. The territory was further expanded by Bhavsinhji's grandson, Vakhatsinhji Gohil when he took possession of lands belonging to Kolis and Kathis, obtained Rajula from the Navab Saheb Ahmad Khan, and merged Ghogha Taluka into the state. In 1793, Vakhatsinhji conquered the forts of Chital and Talaja, and later conquered Mahuva, Kundla, Trapaj, Umrala and Botad. Bhavnagar remained the main port of the state, with Mahuva and Ghogha also becoming important ports. Because of the maritime trade, the state prospered compared to other states. During the late 19th century, the Bhavnagar State Railway was constructed. This made Bhavnagar the first state that was able to construct its railway system without any aid from the central government, which was mentioned in the Imperial Gazetteer. Mr Peile, a political agent, described the state as follows: "With flourishing finances and much good work in progress. Of financial matters I need say little; you have no debts, and your treasury is full." Between 1870 and 1878 the state was put under joint administration, due to the fact that Prince Takhtsinhji was a minor. This period produced some notable reforms in the areas of administration, revenue collection, judiciary, the post and telegraph services, and economic policy. The ports were also modernised. The two people who were responsible for those reforms were Mr E. H. Percival of the Bombay Civil Service and Gaurishankar Udayshankar, Chief Minister of Bhavnagar State Bhavngar Boroz.

In 1911, HH Maharani Nundkanvarba of Bhavnagar, was awarded the Order of the Crown of India, the highest Imperial award for women of the Empire. The former princely state of Bhavnagar was also known as Gohilwad; "Land of the Gohils" (the clan of the ruling family).

=== The Bhavnagar Lancers ===
Initially, the infantry, known as the Bhavnagar State Infantry, were employed as armed police, though some were noted as having been specially trained for artillery duties.

While the State had long maintained an artillery, cavalry and infantry for defense and security, in 1866, these gave way to a body of police, which was found more suitable for keeping order in the towns and villages under the Thakur. In 1890 the Thakur of Bhavnagar joined with other Rulers in Kathiawar in offering a portion of their State troops for re-organization under the Imperial Service Troops Scheme and in the following year it was agreed that Bhavnagar's contribution should be 300 Rajput cavalry.

By 1909 the army was noted as comprising: 256 Imperial Service Lancers, 51 Cavalry, and 285 Infantry.

Nevertheless, during the First World War, the Bhavnagar Lancers were on active service in Egypt, Palestine and Mesopotamia, during which the unit gained a number of battle honors and some of its men received decorations for bravery in the field.

In 1922 both the Lancers and the State Infantry joined the Indian State Forces Scheme. During the Second World War the units themselves were too small to be considered for active service but the Lancers and Infantry supplied men for an Indian Army transport company, as well as providing 15 signalers for the Indian Corps of Signals.

In December 1948 the Bhavnagar Lancers and Infantry, Dhrangadhra Infantry and Porbandar Infantry were amalgamated to form the 2nd Battalion, Saurashtra Infantry. This eventually became a part of the 18th (Saurashtra) Battalion, The Rajputana Rifles, Indian Army. It was subsequently re-designated 11th Battalion, (18th Rajputana Rifles) (Saurashtra), The Mechanised Infantry Regiment, and as such still exists.

=== Merger with the Indian Union in 1948 ===
In 1947, the Deputy Prime Minister of the newly independent Indian Union, Vallabhbhai Patel, undertook the process of unifying 565 princely states with the Union. The Maharaja of Bhavnagar, Krishna Kumarasingh Bhavasingh first king of princely state who handed over the administration of his Bhavnagar State to the people's representative in 1948.

The royal family of Bhavnagar continues to lead an active role in the public eye as well as in business (hotels, real-estate, agriculture and ship breaking) and is held in high regard by the population both in the city as well as areas that comprised the princely state of Bhavanagar.

== Rulers ==
Name	Reign	Title
Ratanji (d. 1703) II	1660–1703	Thakur Sahib
Bhavsinhji I Ratanji (1683–1764)	1703–1764	Thakur Sahib
Akherajji II Bhavsinhji (1714–1772)	1764–1772	Thakur Sahib
Wakhatsinhji Akherajji (1748–1816)	1772–1816	Thakur Sahib
Wajesinhji Wakhatsinhji (1780–1852)	1816–1852	Thakur Sahib
Akherajji III Bhavsinhji (1817–1854)	1852–1854	Thakur Sahib
Jashwantsinhji Bhavsinhji (1827–1870)	1854 – 11 April 1870	Thakur Sahib
Takhtsinhji Jashwantsinhji (1858–1896)	11 April 1870 – 29 January 1896	Thakur Sahib
Bhavsinhji II Takhatsinhji (1896–1919)	29 January 1896 – 1 January 1918	Thakur Sahib
Bhavsinhji II Takhatsinhji (1896–1919)	1 January 1918 – 17 July 1919	Maharaja Raol
Krishnakumarsinhji Bhavsinhji (1912–1965)	17 July 1919 – 15 August 1947	Maharaja Raol
Virbhadrasinhji Krishnakumarsinhji Gohil (1932–1994) (Note: Titular only)	1 April 1965 – 26 Jul 1994	Maharaja Raol
Vijayrajsinhji Virbhadrasinhji Gohil (1968) Shivbhadrasinhji Virbhadrasinhji Gohil	26 July 1994 –	Maharaja Raol
Jaiveerrajsinhji Vijayrajsinhji Gohil	27 October 1990	Maharaja Raol

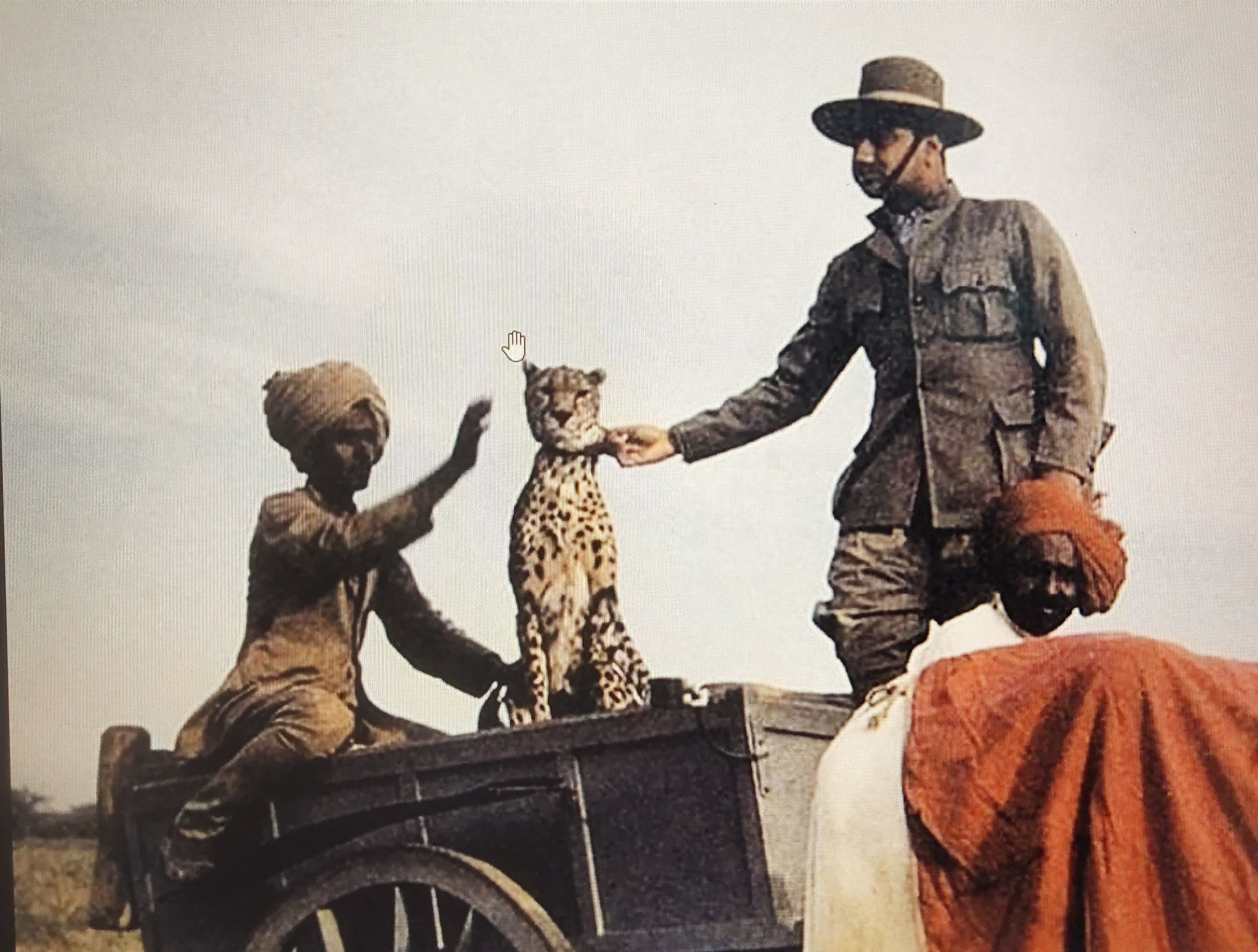
HH Maharaja Raol Shri Krishnakumarsinhji Gohil with his pet cheetah during a hunt. Cheetahs were used as game retrievers at the time.

=== Notable Dewans (chief ministers) of State ===
- Oza Gaurishankar Udayashankar (1846–1877)
- Samaldas Parmananddas Mehta (1877–1884)
- Vithaldas Samaldas Mehta (1884–1900)
- Sir Prabhashankar Pattani (Pattani Prabhashankar Dalpatram) (1900–1937)
- Anantrai Prabhashankar Pattani (1937 – Jan 1948)

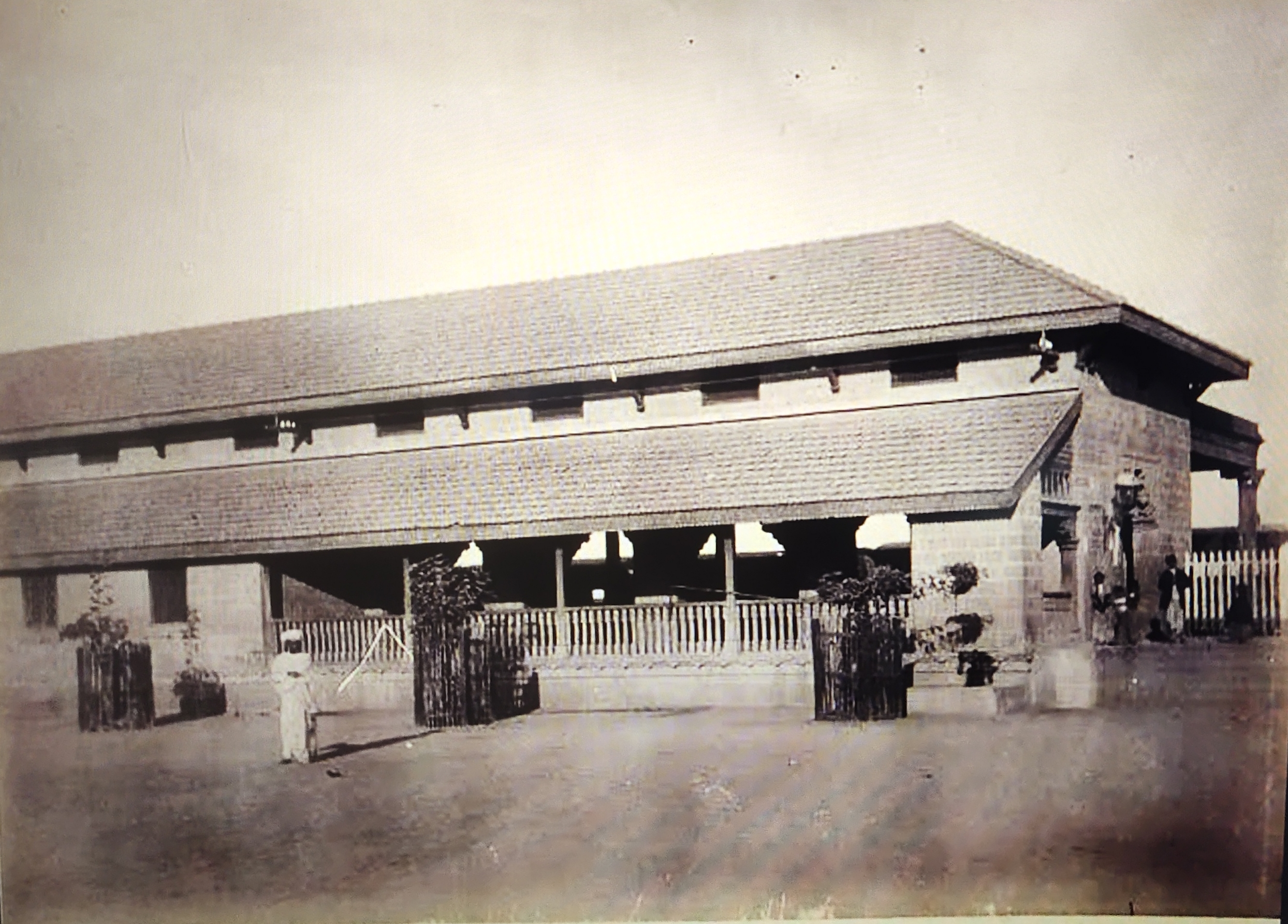
An old photo of Railway Station of Bhavnagar in Saurashtra was taken in 1910 AD. It was built by Bhavnagar State in 1880 AD.

== Legacy ==
- The Bhavnagar State Railway was named after this state.

== See also ==
- Baroda, Western India and Gujarat States Agency
