= Gaurishankar Udayshankar =

Indian politician (1805-1892)

Gaurishankar Udayshankar Oza
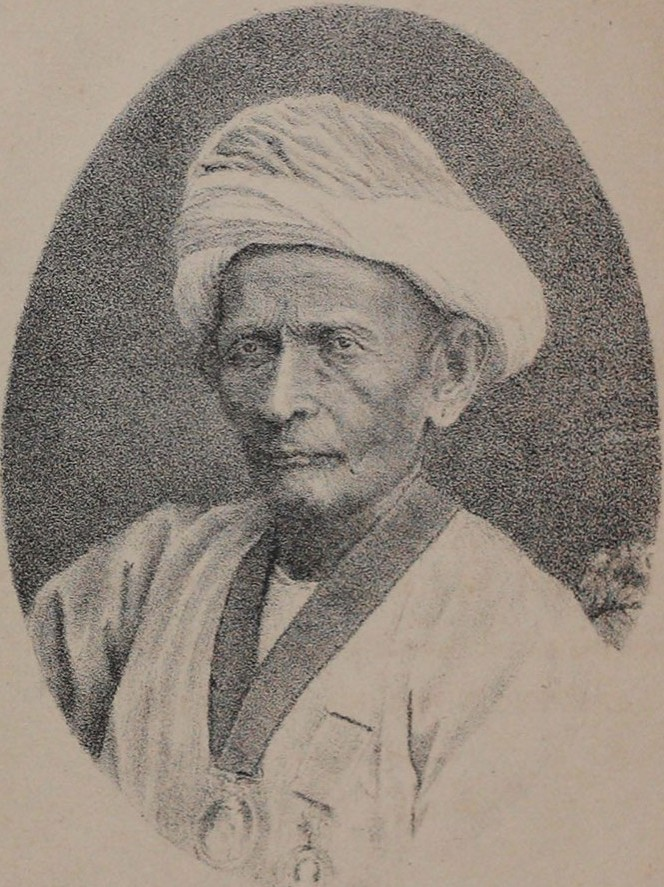
- Born: 21 August 1805
- Died: 1 December 1891 (aged 86)
- Other names: Gaurishankar; Gaga Oza
- Occupations: Politician, administrator

Gaurishankar Udayshankar, Gaurishankar, C.S.I. or Gaga Oza (21 August 1805 – 1 December 1892) was chief minister of Bhavnagar state in Kathiawar, India from 1850 to 1879. He was very well known and well respected for his keen statesmanship.

== Life and career ==
He was born into a family of Vadnagara Nagar Brahmins from Ghogha near Bhavnagar.

He rose from being a revenue officer to state minister in 1847. On the death of the reigning chief, in 1870, he was appointed joint administrator in concert with a British official.

During his tenure, many improvements were introduced. The land revenue was based on a cash system, the fiscal and customs systems were remodelled and tree planting was encouraged. The Gowrishankar Waterworks was completed in Bhavnagar, on which six lakhs of rupees were spent. The Bhavnagar state began construction of a network of railway lines over the peninsula of Kathiawar. The British government acknowledged Gowrishankar's many services with the distinction of Order of the Star of India in 1877.

== Charitable and religious works ==
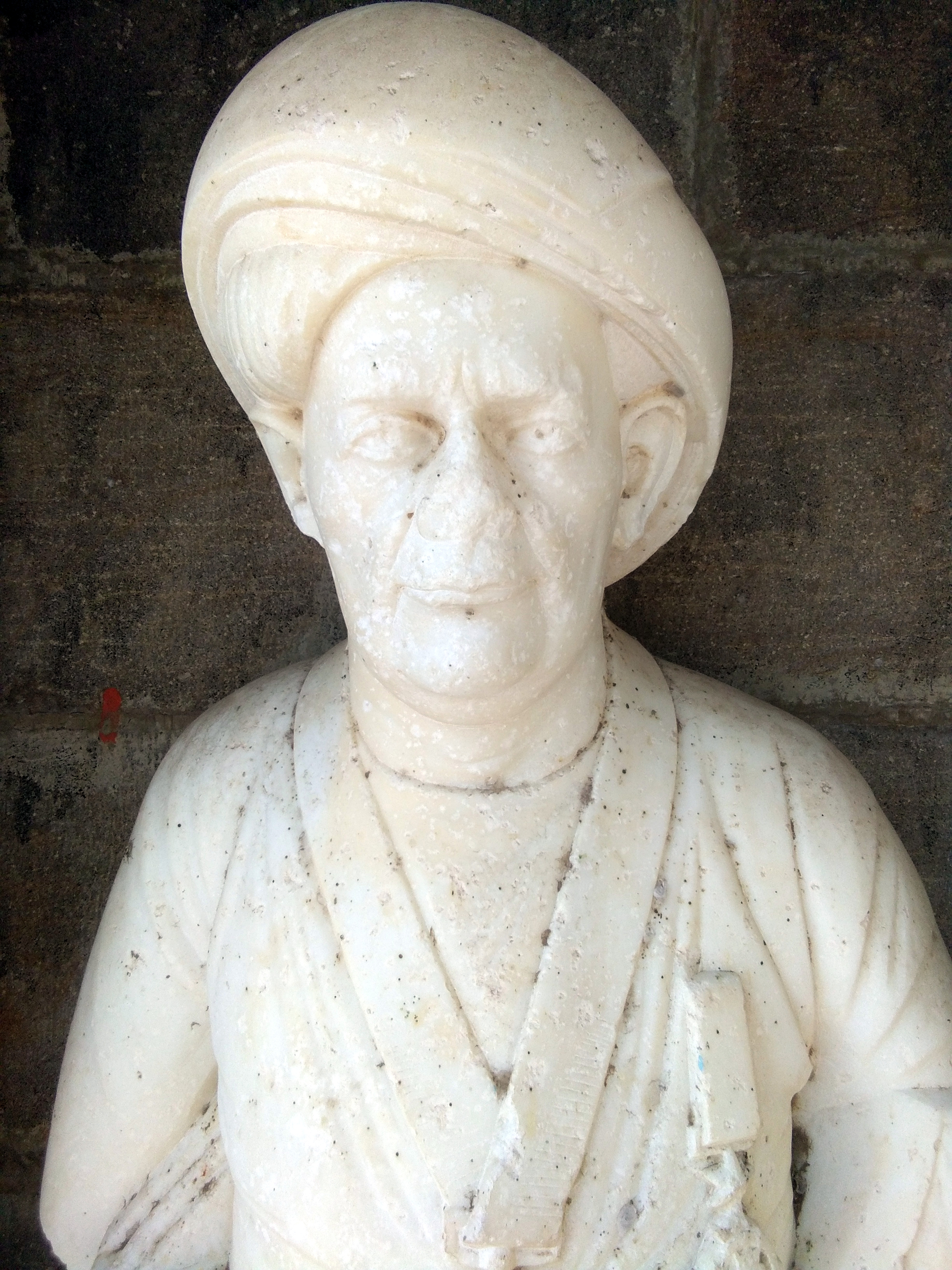
Bust of Gaurishankar Udayshankar

He helped to establish the Rajkumar College at Rajkot, for the education of native princes, and also the Rajasthanik Court, which, after settling innumerable disputes between the land-owning classes and the chiefs, has since been abolished. In 1879 Gowrishankar resigned office, and devoted himself to the study of the higher literature of that Vedanta philosophy which through his whole life had been to him a solace and guide. In 1884 he wrote a work called Svarupanu-sandhan, on the union of the soul with Deity, which led to a letter of warm congratulation from Max Müller, who also published a short biography of him. In 1887 he put on the robe of the Sanyasi or ascetic, the fourth stage, according to the Hindu Shastras, in the life of the twice-born man, and in this manner passed the remainder of his life, giving above ten hours each day to Vedantic studies and holy contemplation. He died, revered by all classes, in December 1892.

== Legacy ==
On 20 December 1959 - a biographical play was broadcast on All India Radio. This was authored by Jitubhai Mehta.
