= Rajkumar College, Rajkot =

Rajkumar College

Location
- Gymkhana Road; Rajkot 360001; India
- 22.2932°N 70.7974°E

Information
- Type: Public (1938)
- Motto: "Knowledge is Power"
- Established: 1868
- Founder: Richard Harte Keatinge
- School district: Rajkot
- President: HH Thakore Saheb Shri Mandhatasinhji of Rajkot
- Principal: Mr. Yash Saxena
- Grades: K-12
- Enrollment: 1900
- Houses: Jhalawar, Halar, Sorath, Gohilwar
- Athletics: Track and field, and athletics meet annually
- Athletics conference: Boys and Girls Assemble
- Sports: Cricket, football, hockey, swimming, basketball, tennis, table tennis, horse riding, volleyball, rifle shooting
- Nickname: RKC
- Affiliation: CBSE
- Alumni website: http://www.rkcalumni.com/
- Website: www.rkcrajkot.com/

The Rajkumar College (or RKC) in Rajkot, Gujarat is one of the oldest K-12 institutions in India. RKC has a 28.656-acre (1,15,965 m^{2}) campus in Rajkot. The foundation stone of The Rajkumar College was laid in 1868. The institution was designed by Colonel Keatinge and was formally opened by the Governor of Bombay, H. B. Sir Seymour Fitzgerald, in 1870 and just celebrated Sesquicentenary in 2020 . The college was founded for the education of the princely order by the princes and chiefs of Kathiawad for their sons and relations.

== Girls College ==
Rajkumar College for Girls was introduced on 24 March 2011 by Governor of Gujarat Kamala Beniwal.

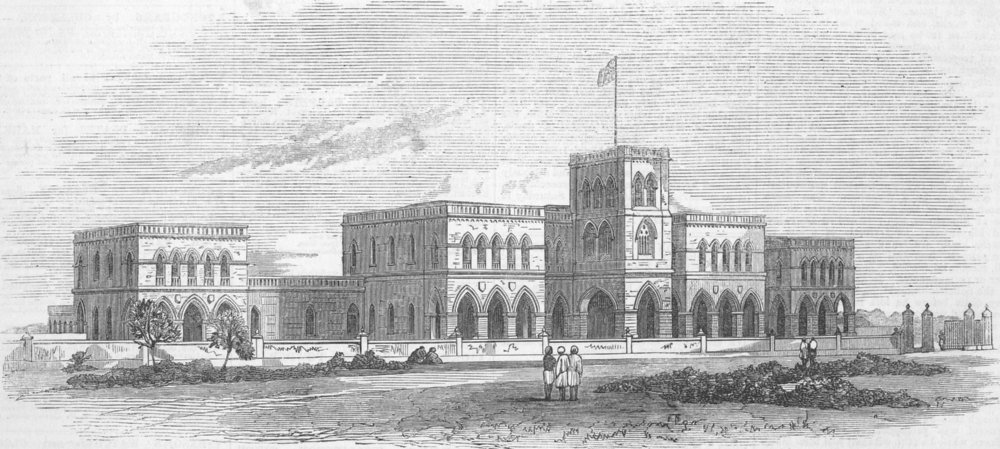
Rajkoomar Indian College, Kattywar

== Notable alumni ==
- Takhtsinhji, Maharaja of Bhavnagar The first student
- Shahu Maharaj of Kolhapur, Social Equality Reformer
- Maharaja Bhavsinhji II of Bhavnagar State
- Ranjitsinhji, Jam Saheb of Nawanagar, Cricketer
- Digvijaysinhji Ranjitsinhji Jadeja, Awarded Poland's highest honor, the President's medal.
- Krishna Kumarsinhji Bhavsinhji, The first Governor of Madras Presidency at Independence
- Sambhaji Raje Chhatrapati
- Ajay Jadeja, former Indian Cricketer

== See also ==
- Rajkumar College, Raipur
- List of the oldest schools in the world
- History of the Indian cricket team
