= Bhavnagar =

- City
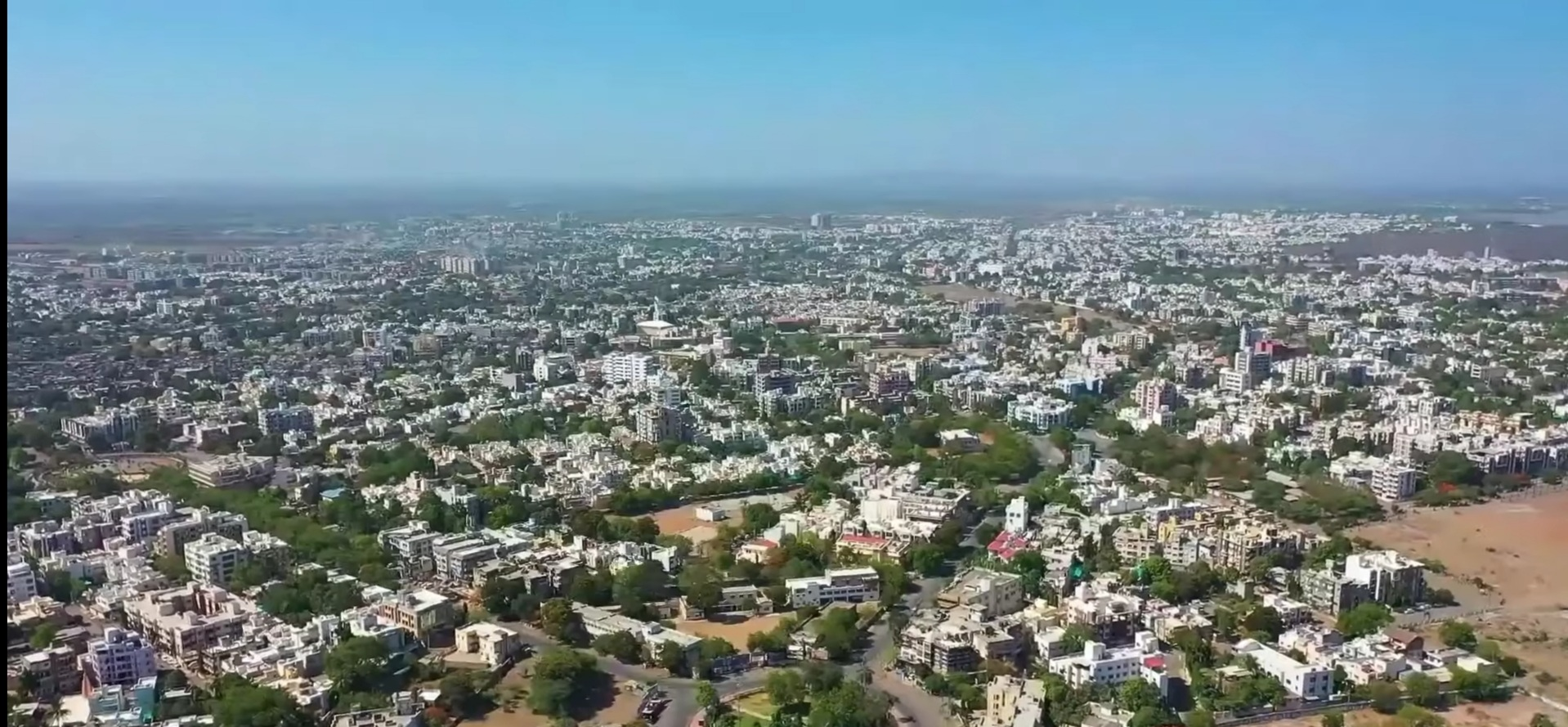
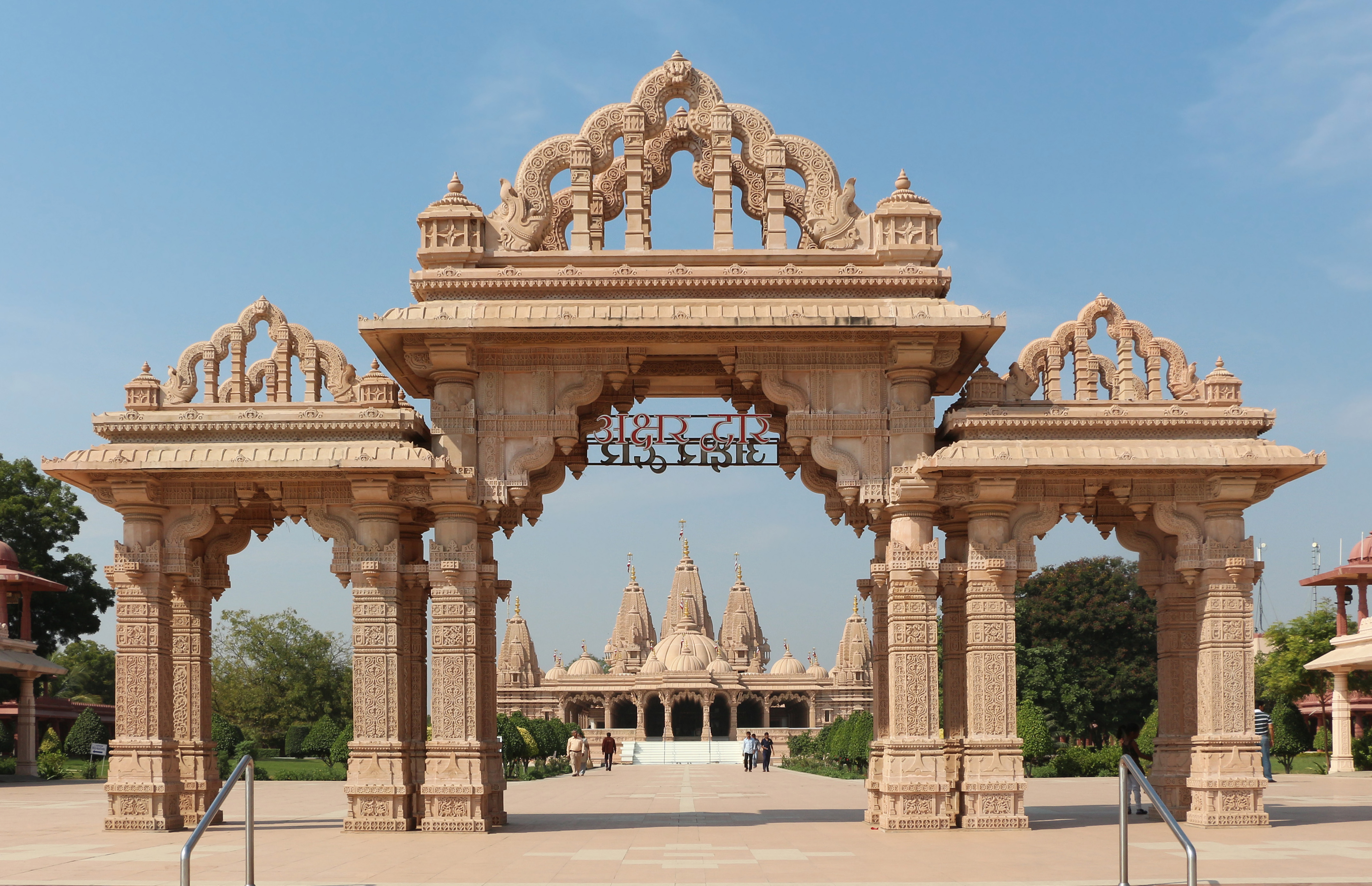
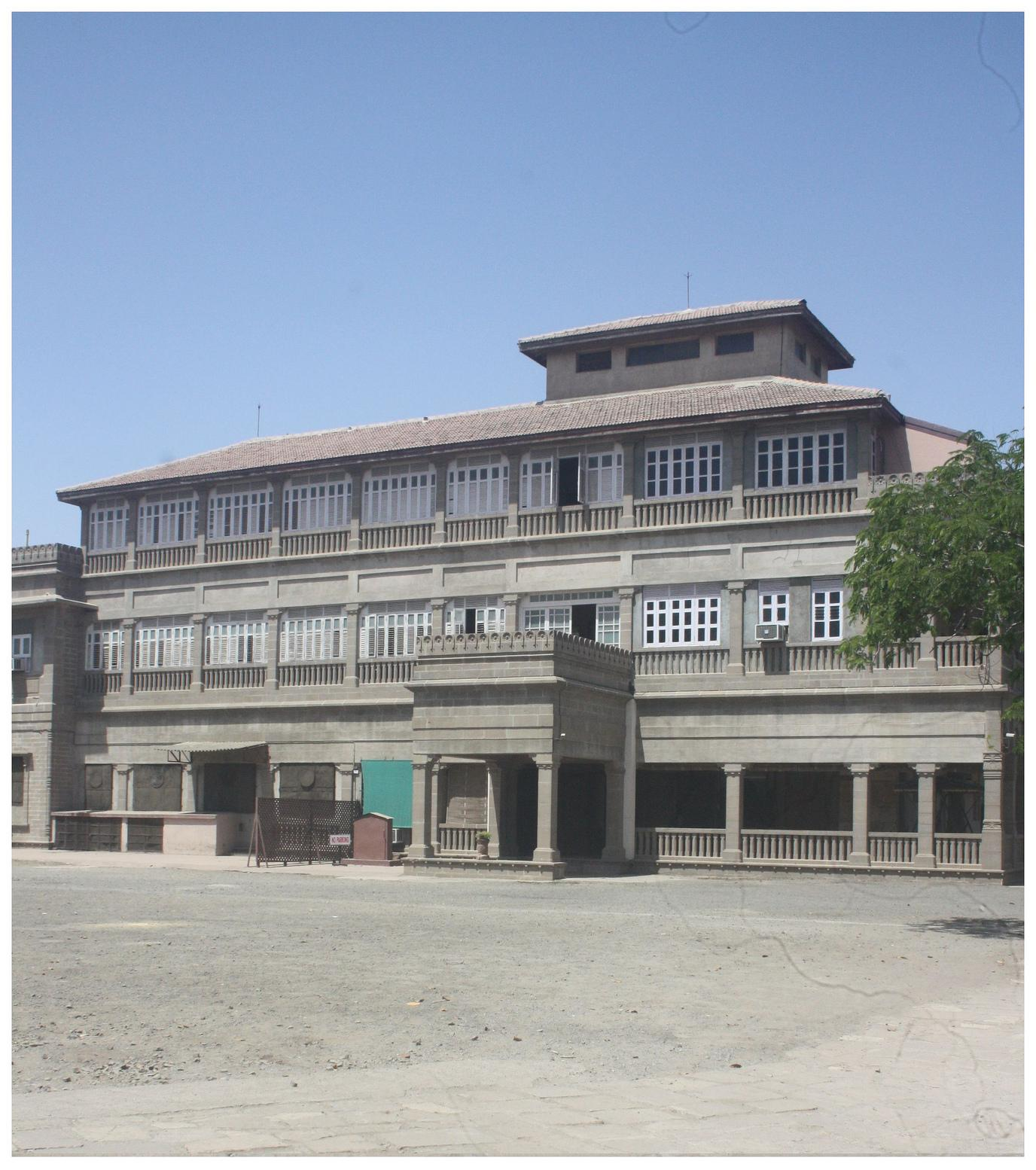
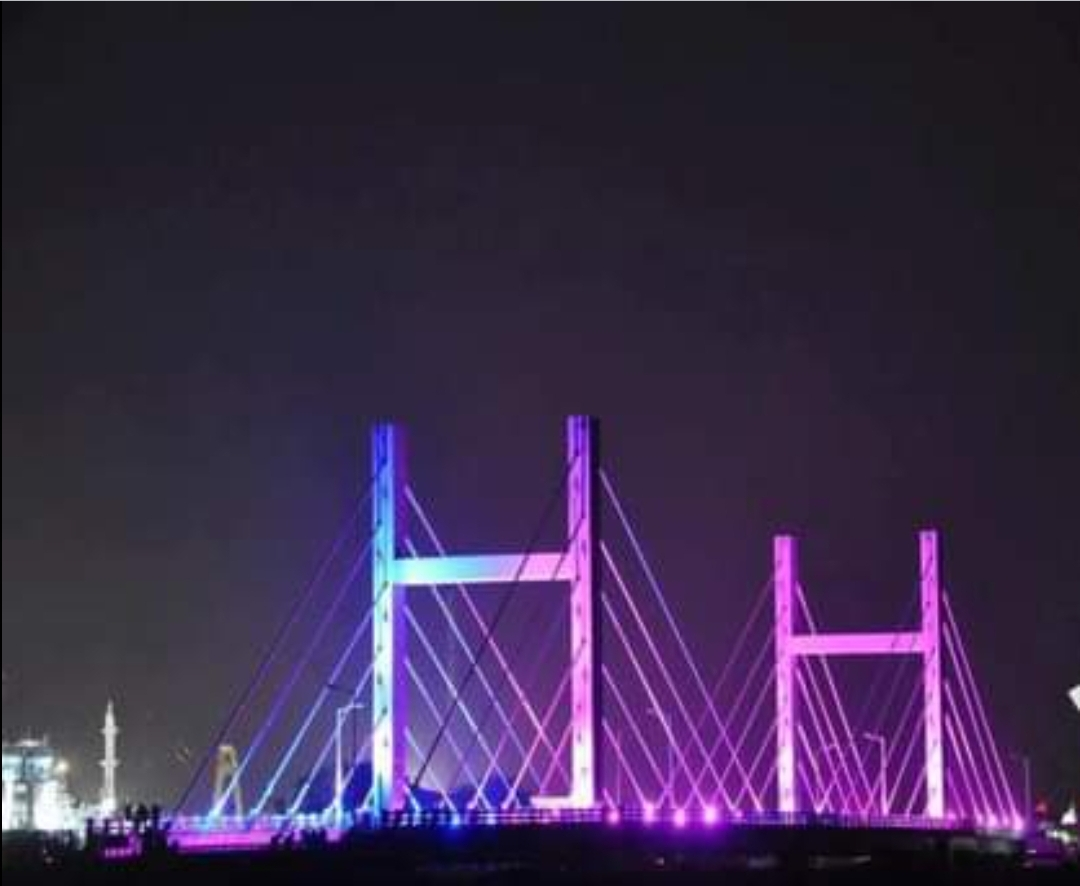
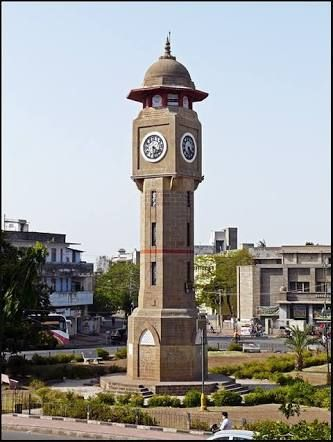
- From top: City view, Shri Swaminarayan Mandir, Cable stayed bridge, Crescent tower, Nilambagh Palace
- Nicknames: Bhavena Nagari, Gohilwad
- Bhavnagar, Gujarat, India Bhavnagar (India)
- Coordinates: 21.76°N 72.15°E
- Country: India
- State: Gujarat
- Region: Saurashtra
- District: Bhavnagar
- Founded: 1723
- Founder: Bhavsinhji Takhtasinhji Gohil

Government
  - Type: Municipal Corporation
  - Body: Bhavnagar Municipal Corporation and BADA (Bhavnagar Area Development Authority)
  - Municipal Commissioner: M. A. Gandhi
  - Mayor: Bharatbhai M Barad
  - Member of Parliament: Nimuben Bambhaniya

Area
  - Total: 119 km^{2} (46 sq mi)
  - Rank: 5
- Elevation: 24 m (79 ft)

Population (2011)
  - Total: 643,382 (urban)
  - Density: 5,410/km^{2} (14,000/sq mi)
- Demonym: Bhavnagari

Languages
  - Official: Gujarati
- Time zone: UTC+5:30 (IST)
- PIN: 364 001, 364 002, 364 003, 364 004, 364 005, 364 006
- Telephone code: (+91)278
- Vehicle registration: GJ-04
- Website: bmcgujarat.com

Bhavnagar is a city and the headquarters of Bhavnagar district in the Indian state of Gujarat. Bhavnagar was founded in 1723 by Bhavsinhji Gohil. It was the capital of Bhavnagar State, which was a princely state before it was merged into the Indian Union in February 1948.Bhavnagar currently has the 5th largest population in Gujarat.

Bhavnagar is situated 190 kilometres or 120 miles away from the state capital Gandhinagar and to the west of the Gulf of Khambhat. It has always been an important city for trade with many large and small scale industries along with the world's largest ship breaking yard, Alang which is located 50 kilometres or 31 miles away. Historically, Bhavnagar holds the distinction of being the first princely state to voluntarily merge into the Union of India in January 1948, a move led by Maharaja Krishnakumarsinhji Gohil. The city is a significant educational center in Gujarat; Shamaldas Arts College, founded by Maharaja Takhtsinhji in 1885, is historically prominent as the institution where Mahatma Gandhi studied in 1888. Gandhi's admission to the college is recorded as one of the earliest milestones in his academic journey before he left for London to study law. The city serves as the gateway to Blackbuck National Park, Velavadar, which is recognized as the only tropical grassland in India to be designated as a National Park along with Victoria park which is the only urban forest of Gujarat located at the heart of Bhavnagar Bhavnagar is also famous for its version of the popular Gujarati snack 'Ganthiya' and 'Jalebi'.

== History ==
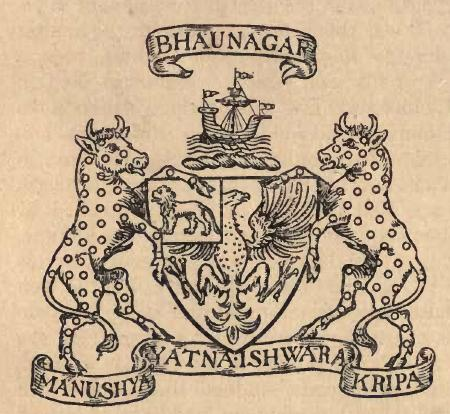
Coat of arms of the Indian native state of Bhaunagar

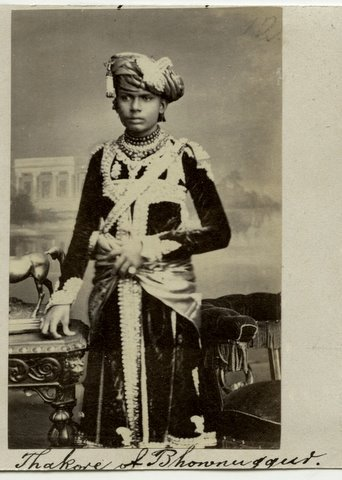
Thakur of Bhavnagar in the 1870s

The Gohil Rajput of the Suryavanshi clan faced severe competition in Marwar. Around 1260 AD, they moved down to the Gujarat's coastal area and established three capitals: Sejakpur (now Ranpur), Umrala, and Sihor. Sejakpur was founded in 1194.

In 1722–1723, the forces led by Khanthaji Kadani and Maratha Pilaji Gaekwad attempted to raid Sihor but were repelled by Maharajah Bhavsinhji Gohil. After the war, Bhavsinhji realized the reason for repeated attacks was the location of Sihor. In 1723, on auspicious day of vaishakh Shukla Tritiya also known as Akshay Tritiya he established a new capital near Vadva village, 20 km away from Sihor, and named it Bhavnagar after himself . It was a carefully chosen and strategic location because of its potential for maritime trade. Naturally, Bhavnagar became the capital of Bhavnagar State. In 1807, Bhavnagar State became a British protectorate.

The old town of Bhavnagar was a fortified town with gates leading to other important regional towns. It remained a major port for almost two centuries, trading commodities with Mozambique, Zanzibar, Singapore, and the Persian Gulf.

Bhavsinhji ensured that Bhavnagar benefited from the revenue that was brought in from maritime trade, which was monopolized by Surat and Cambay. As the castle of Surat was under the control of the Siddis of Janjira, Bhavsinhji brokered an agreement with them, giving the Sidis 1.25% of the revenue by Bhavnagar port. Bhavsinhji entered into a similar agreement with the British when they took over Surat in 1856. Whilst Bhavsinhji was in power, Bhavnagar grew from a small chieftainship to a considerably important state. This was due to the addition of new territories as well as the income provided by maritime trade. Bhavsinhji's successors continued to encourage maritime trade through Bhavnagar port, recognizing its importance to the state. The territory was further expanded by Bhavsinhji's grandson, Vakhatsinhji Gohil, when he took possession of lands belonging to Kolis and Kathis, obtained Rajula from the Navab Saheb Ahmad Khan, and merged Ghogha Taluka into the state.

In 1793, Vakhatsinhji conquered the forts of Chital and Talaja, and later conquered Mahuva, Kundla, Trapaj, Umrala and Botad. Bhavnagar remained the main port of the state, with Mahuva and Ghogha also becoming important ports. Because of the maritime trade, the state prospered compared to other states. During the late 19th century, the Bhavnagar State Railway was constructed. This made Bhavnagar the first state that was able to construct its railway system without any aid from the central government, which was mentioned in The Imperial Gazetteer of India. Mr. Peile, a political agent, described the state as follows:

With flourishing finances and much good work in progress. Of financial matters I need say little; you have no debts, and your treasury is full.

Between 1870 and 1878, the state were put under joint administration, due to the fact that Prince Takhtsinhji was a minor. This period produced some notable reforms in the areas of administration, revenue collection, judiciary, the post and telegraph services, and economic policy. The ports were also modernized. The two people who were responsible for those reforms were E. H. Percival of the Bombay Civil Service and Gaurishankar Udayshankar Oza, Chief Minister of Bhavnagar State Bhavnagar Boroz.

In 1911, HH Maharani Nundkanvarba of Bhavnagar was awarded the Order of the Crown of India, the highest Imperial award for women of the British Empire. The former princely state of Bhavnagar was also known as Gohilwad, "Land of the Gohils" (the clan of the ruling family).

=== Merger with the Indian Union in 1947 ===
Until the independence of India in 1947, Bhavnagar was an independent state ruled by the Rajput Gohil family. In 1947, the Deputy Prime Minister of the newly independent Indian Union Sardar Vallabhbhai Patel undertook the ambitious and complex process of unifying 562 princely states with the Union of India. The last ruling Maharajah of Bhavnagar, Krishna Kumarsinhji handed over the administration of his Bombay State to the people's representative in 1948.

Kumarsinhji was one of the first to merge his princely state to the Union of India.

The erstwhile royal family of Bhavnagar continues to lead an active role in the public eye as well as in business (hotels, real estate, agriculture, and ship-breaking) and is held in high regard by the population both in the city as well as areas that comprised the former princely state of Bhavnagar. The city celebrated its 300th anniversary (tercentenary) in 2023.

== Geography ==
=== Topography ===
Bhavnagar is a coastal city on the eastern coast of Saurashtra, also known as Kathiawar, located at 21.77°N 72.15°E. It has an average elevation of 24 metres or 78.7 feet. It occupies an area of 53.3 square kilometres or 20.6 square miles and is the fifth most populated city of Gujarat. The general slope dips towards the northeast at the apex of Gulf of Khambhat. A small non-perennial river named Kansara Nala passes through the outer area of the city.

=== Geology ===
The region of Saurashtra is a geologically active part of West India, and falls in the seismic zone 3 of the Zoning Map of the Bureau of Indian Standards. The region as a whole and the area around Bhavnagar, in particular, has been tectonically unstable.

Between 9 August 2000 and 15 December 2000, there was a series of earthquakes in east Saurashtra with epicenters in Bhavnagar. 132 earthquakes between magnitude 0.5 to 3.8 were recorded. There were five earthquakes greater than magnitude 3, with a maximum magnitude of 3.8. These events were confined to an area which covered the southern part of Bhavnagar city and Tarsamiya village on the outskirts of the town. There was no loss of life recorded due to this earthquake.

According to historical records, an earthquake of magnitude 7 occurred near Bhavnagar in February 1705. Earthquake swarm activity also occurred in and around Paliyad (60 km north of Bhavnagar) during July–August 1938 for about two months, with four earthquakes of magnitude greater than or equal to 5 and a maximum magnitude of 6.0.

=== Climate ===
Like most of Gujarat, Bhavnagar has a hot semi-arid climate (Köppen: BSh), with sweltering, dry summers from March to mid-June, the hot and humid southwest monsoon from mid-June to October, and the very warm "winter" from November to February. There is essentially no rainfall outside the monsoon season, whilst during the monsoon the city receives around 715 millimetres or 28 inches of rain on average, though variability is extreme as can be seen from annual totals as high as 1,428.9 millimetres or 56.26 inches in 1970 but as little as 157.2 millimetres or 6.19 inches in 1974. The semi-arid classification is due to the city's high evapotranspiration. The average temperature from November to February is around 23 °C or 73.4 °F, with low humidity.

Climate data for Bhavnagar Airport, (1991–2020, extremes 1969–2020)
Month	Jan	Feb	Mar	Apr	May	Jun	Jul	Aug	Sep	Oct	Nov	Dec	Year
Record high °C (°F)	35.0 (95.0)	39.4 (102.9)	43.3 (109.9)	45.0 (113.0)	47.3 (117.1)	45.4 (113.7)	41.6 (106.9)	40.2 (104.4)	41.1 (106.0)	41.3 (106.3)	38.3 (100.9)	35.0 (95.0)	47.3 (117.1)
Mean daily maximum °C (°F)	27.9 (82.2)	30.7 (87.3)	35.1 (95.2)	38.2 (100.8)	39.8 (103.6)	37.4 (99.3)	33.5 (92.3)	32.4 (90.3)	33.3 (91.9)	35.0 (95.0)	32.5 (90.5)	29.2 (84.6)	33.8 (92.8)
Mean daily minimum °C (°F)	14.0 (57.2)	16.4 (61.5)	20.9 (69.6)	24.6 (76.3)	26.9 (80.4)	27.5 (81.5)	26.2 (79.2)	25.2 (77.4)	24.7 (76.5)	23.2 (73.8)	19.1 (66.4)	15.3 (59.5)	22.0 (71.6)
Record low °C (°F)	0.6 (33.1)	2.8 (37.0)	8.3 (46.9)	12.8 (55.0)	19.4 (66.9)	17.8 (64.0)	21.6 (70.9)	21.2 (70.2)	19.7 (67.5)	13.3 (55.9)	6.1 (43.0)	5.0 (41.0)	0.6 (33.1)
Average rainfall mm (inches)	1.8 (0.07)	0.0 (0.0)	0.9 (0.04)	1.7 (0.07)	2.2 (0.09)	141.6 (5.57)	239.0 (9.41)	163.6 (6.44)	142.2 (5.60)	20.9 (0.82)	2.9 (0.11)	1.1 (0.04)	718.0 (28.27)
Average rainy days	0.3	0.0	0.1	0.2	0.3	5.3	10.3	9.3	5.5	1.1	0.3	0.1	32.6
Average relative humidity (%) (at 17:30 IST)	36	28	23	27	39	54	70	72	65	41	36	38	44
Source: India Meteorological Department

== Demographics ==
Religions in Bhavnagar city (2011)
Religion	Percent
Hinduism	84.58%
Islam	12.21%
Jainism	2.64%

As of 2011 India census, Bhavnagar had a population of 593,768. Bhavnagar has an average literacy rate of 86%, higher than the national average of 74.04%; with male literacy of 91% and female literacy of 80%. 10% of the population is under 6 years of age. Adult males constitute 52% of the population and females 48%.

== City planning and architecture ==
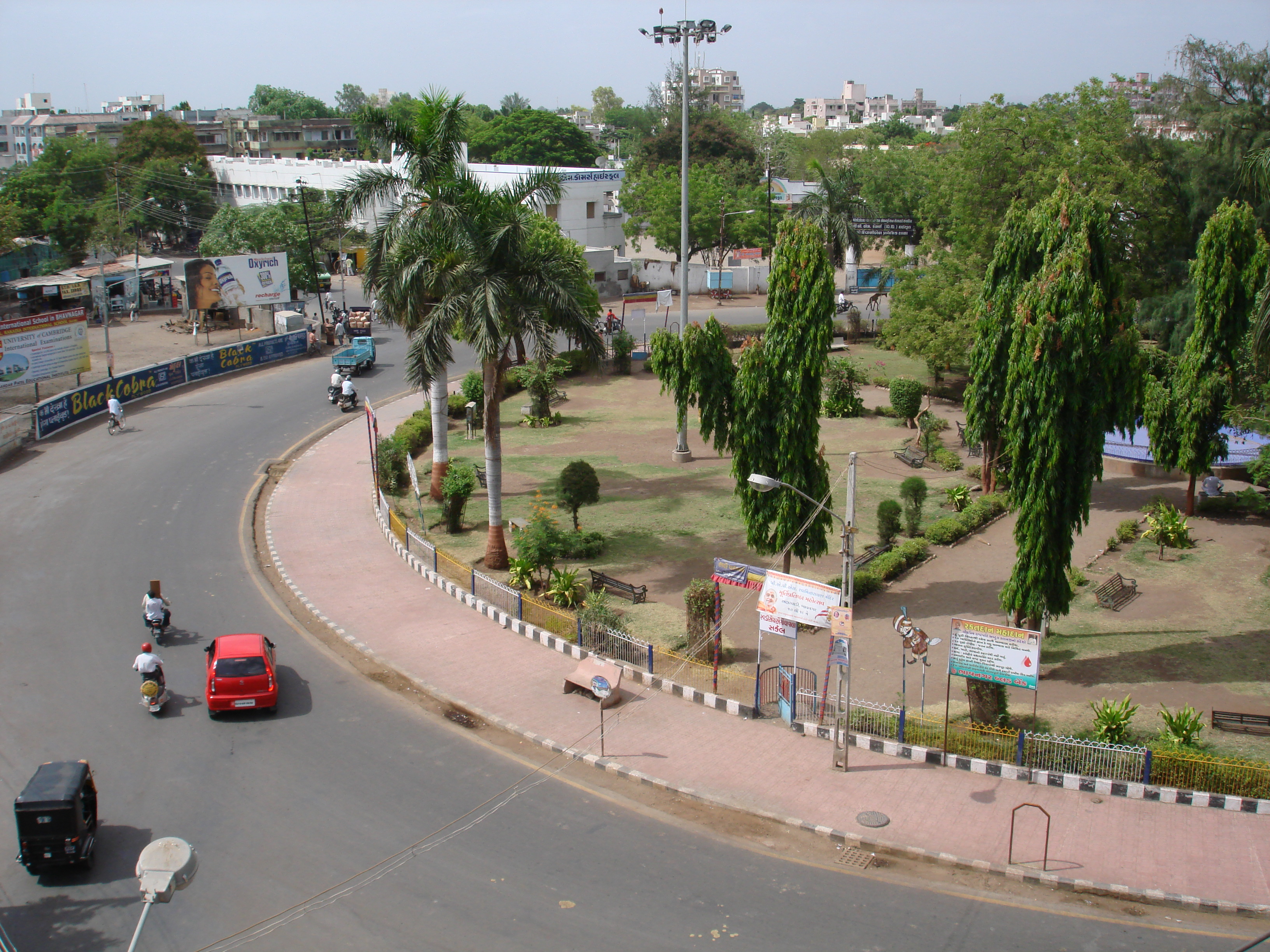
Ghogha Circle

Multiple town planning schemes were designed and implemented under the guidance of the progressive rulers of Bhavnagar. During the reign of Sir Takhtsinhji, the British State Engineer Proctor Sims supervised the construction of Barton Library, Sir Takhtsinhji Hospital.

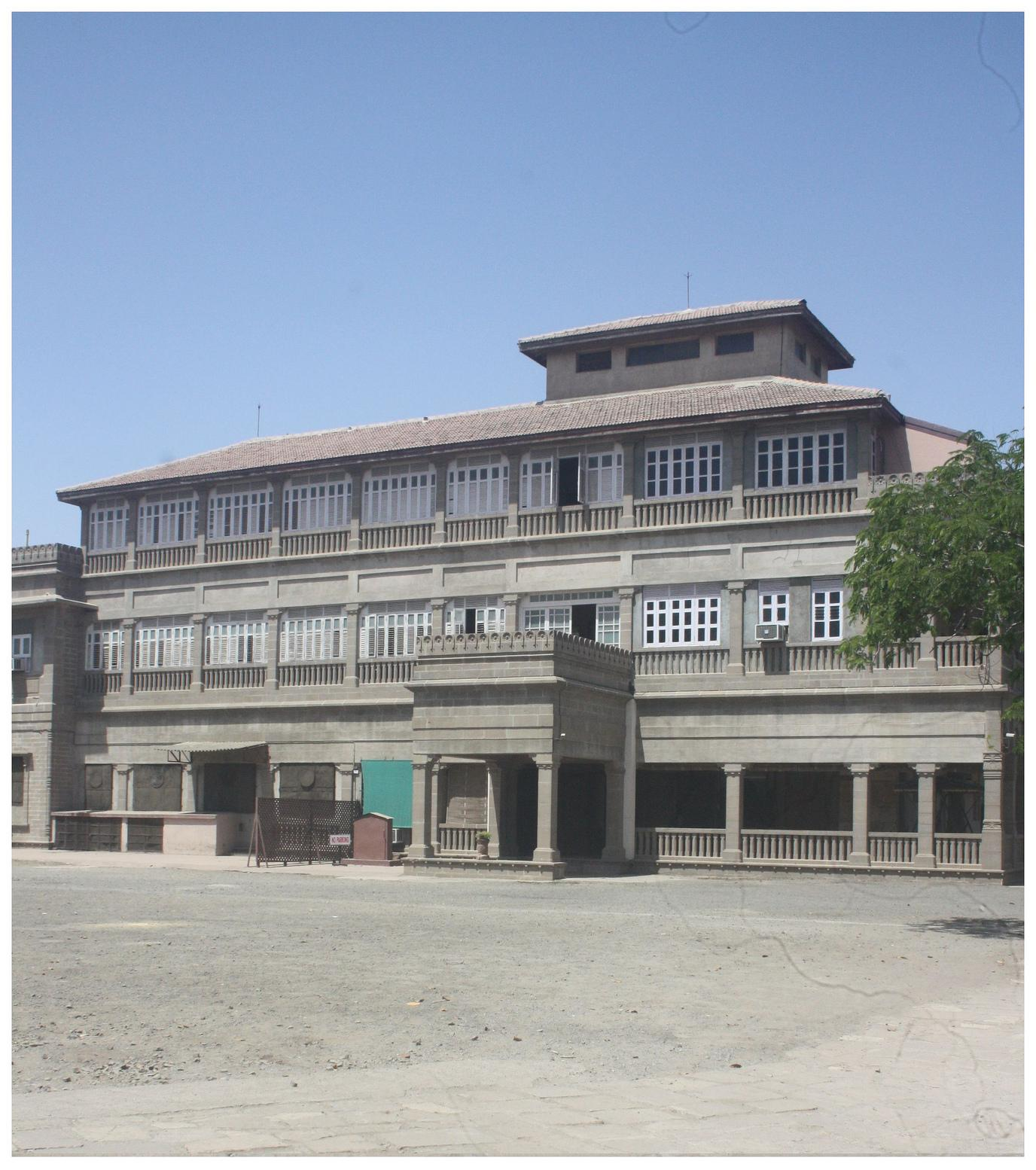
Nilambagh Palace, Bhavnagar

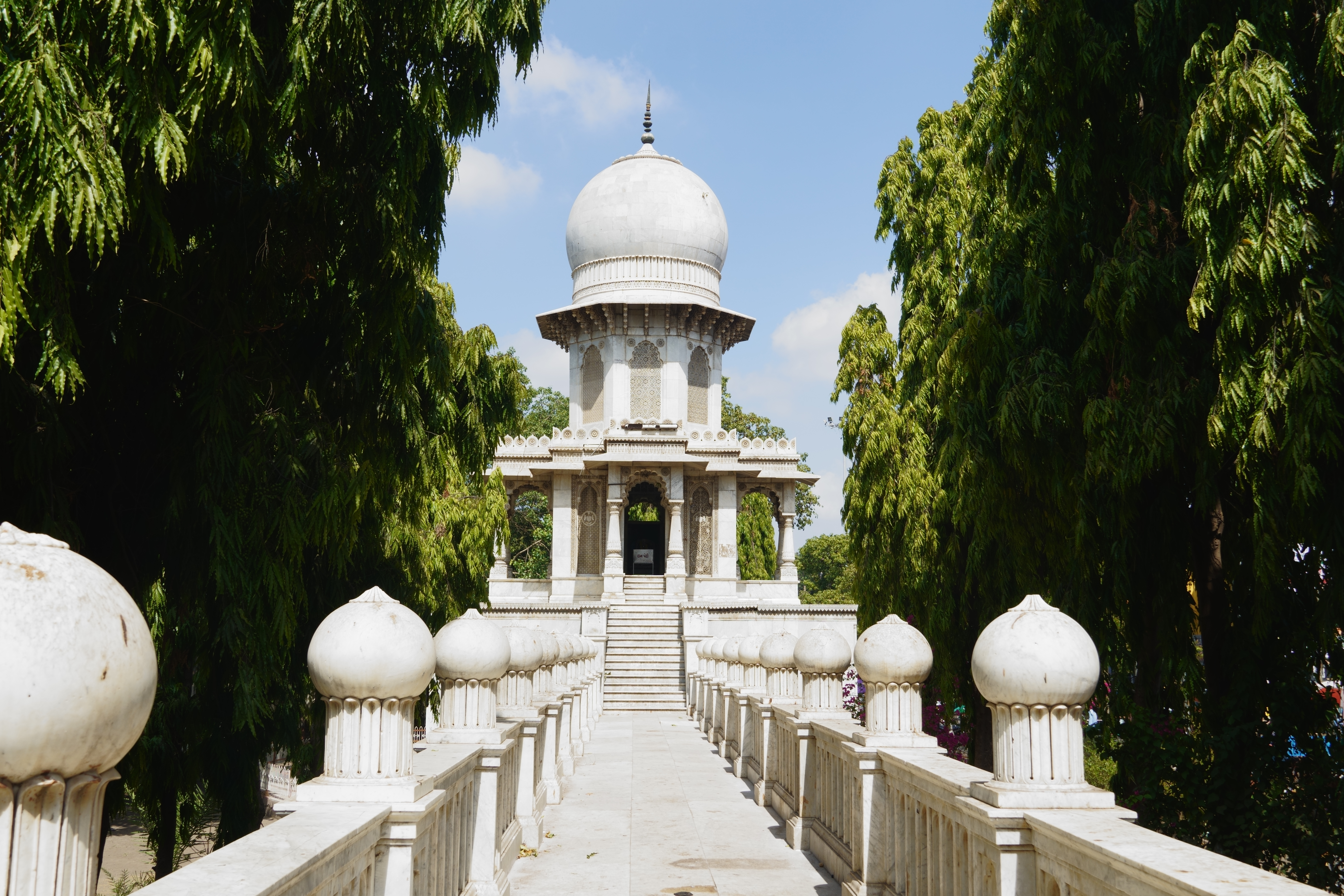
Gangajalia

A few architectural examples include:

- Takhteshwar Temple (1893) is located on a hill, on a high plinth, offering a commanding view of Bhavnagar. The high shikhara rising above the pillared rectangular mandapa makes it an important landmark.
- Gangajalia (1893) is a temple dedicated to Ganga-Devi, with a chhatri, pavilion, and bridge all of white marble. It is located in the middle of a former tank. It was designed by Sir John Griffith, principal of Sir J J School of Arts, Bombay.
- Nilambag Palace (1894), now a heritage hotel, is set amidst a huge estate of 10 acres (4.0 ha). It was designed by a British architect, William Emerson as a royal residence; he also designed the Sir Takhtsinhji Hospital and later Victoria Memorial in Calcutta. It combines elements of Indian architecture with a modern outlook.
- Barton Library (1895) is a two-storeyed building, appropriately designed for a road junction. It has two wings and a central tower, constructed in ashlar stone masonry, with Gothic arch windows and a sloping roof with Mangalore tiles. It is one of the oldest libraries of Gujarat and also houses a museum.
- Town Hall (1932) was formerly a Darbar Hall, where the coronation of Sir Krishnakumarsinhji took place. It is an imposing structure in the colonial style, set in a well laid out garden.
- Modern & Contemporary Architectural services is provided by various leading Architectural firm like SAGA whose work is diverse yet of unified character, not only functional, aesthetic and techno-savvy.

Modern Bhavnagar comprises Takhteshvar Plots, Krishnanagar, Sardarnagar and surrounding area. During 1935–1937, Krishnanagar area was planned and developed by late Shri Virendrabhai C. Mehta, the official town planner for the State of Bhavnagar. In 1961, he extended his Krishnanagar plan towards Sardarnagar. In 1975, he created a master plan for Bhavnagar.

A salient feature of town planning is to have gardens at the junction of roads. Gardens are located at Ghogha Circle, Mahila College Circle, Rupani Circle, Meghani Circle, Shivaji Circle, Sardarnagar Circle, Jewels Circle and Crescent Circle.

The city of Bhavnagar was one of the earliest towns in Gujarat to have underground drainage, and also among the state's first cities to have a water filtration plant.

== Universities and colleges ==
- Government Engineering College, Bhavnagar
- Government Medical College, Bhavnagar
- Maharaja Krishnakumarsinhji Bhavnagar University
- Samaldas Arts College (first college in Bhavnagar)
- Shantilal Shah Engineering College
- Smt. R.D. Gardi Bhavnagar Stree (affiliated to SNDT Women's University)

=== Research and development ===
Bhavnagar has a research and development centre known as Central Salt and Marine Chemicals Research Institute (CSMCRI).

== Municipal Finance ==
As per the Ministry of Housing and Urban Affairs, the Bhavnagar Municipal Corporation reported a revenue of ₹361 crore (US$43 million) and an expenditure of ₹372 crore (US$45 million) in 2022–23. Taxes contributed to 37.4% of the revenue, while the remaining income came from non-tax sources such as grants and other municipal revenues.

== Transportation ==
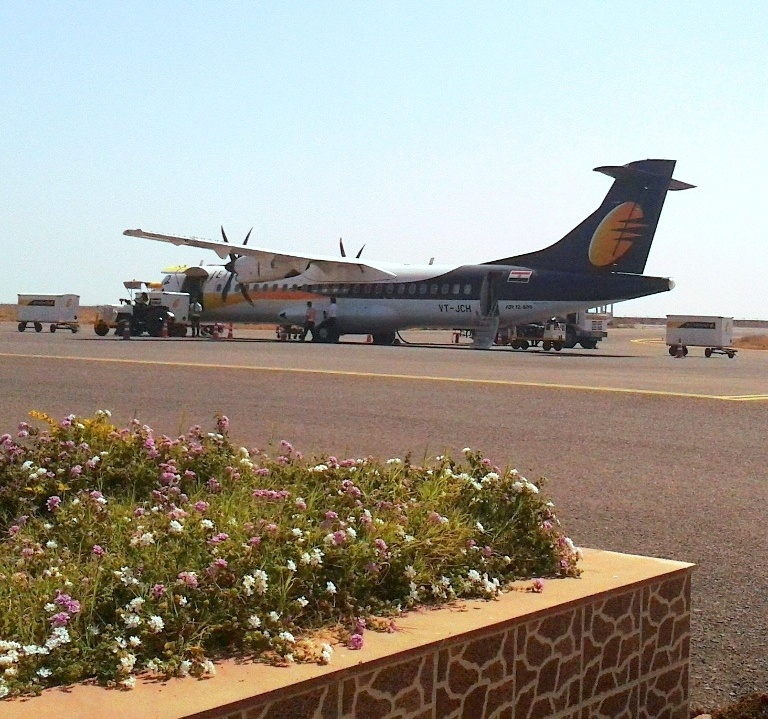
Aircraft at Bhavnagar Airport

- Bhavnagar State Transport Bus stand
- Bhavnagar Terminus railway station
- Bhavnagar Para railway station
- Bhavnagar Airport BHU (IATA)

== Port ==
Bhavnagar port had trade links with Southeast Asia, Africa, Arabia and ports of Red Sea since the early 18th century. The old port Bhavnagar Harbar was built by the state of Bhavnagar, and hosted a light beacon since 1860. Bhavnagar port was later modernized in 1930 under the supervision of J. Johnston, then port officer of Bhavnagar state. Wharfs, warehouses, and railway transportation were added. A new port, 8 kilometres (5.0 mi) south of the old port, was built and made operational in the 1950s due to heavy silting at the location of the old port. This port also had a lighthouse, which was damaged in the 2001 earthquake.

== Notable people ==
Bhavnagar has produced many reformists, thinkers, socialists, poets, writers, artists, educationists, and independence activists.

- Gijubhai Badheka – educationist and reformer
- Nimuben Bambhaniya - Minister of State in the Ministry of Consumer Affairs, Food and Public Distribution, Government of India
- Thakkar Bapa - social worker
- Krishna Kumarsinhji Bhavsinhji – last Ruler of Bhavnagar
- Mulshankar Bhatt – an educationist
- Nanabhai Bhatt – founder of Lok Bharti, educationist, creative writer, thinker
- Nazir Dekhaiya – poet
- Harvik Desai - Indian cricketer
- Gangasati – a medieval Gujarati saint poet who wrote many devotional songs. The shrine of Gangasati and Panbai is situated on the riverbed of the Kalubhar river.
- Devang Gandhi - Former Indian Cricketer
- Parthiv Gohil – Bollywood & Gujarati film singer
- Shaktisinh Gohil – Member of Parliament, Rajya Sabha, former minister of education, health, finance, Narmada, in Gujarat government
- Sheldon Jackson – a first class cricketer of Saurashtra
- Chirag Jani – cricketer of Saurashtra cricket team
- Pankaj Joshi (physicist) - an Indian astrophysicist and cosmologist
- Kavi Kant – a royal poet of Bhavnagar state
- Apara Mehta – television actress
- Asoka Mehta – (24 October 1911, Bhavnagar – 10 December 1984, New Delhi) Indian Freedom Fighter and Socialist Politician.
- Balwantrai Mehta – second chief minister of Gujarat martyred in 1965.
- Vaikunthbhai Mehta - a pioneer leader of Cooperative Movement in India
- Asha Parekh – Bollywood film actress
- Kishor Parekh - an Indian photojournalist
- Daksha Pattani - Gujarati academic and author
- Sir Prabhashanker Pattani - Secretary of King, Bhavnagar State
- Takhtsijhji Gohil - Maharaja Of Bhavnagar.
- Prahlad Parekh – poet
- Ashok Chavda - Ashok Chavda, also known by his pen name Bedil, is a Gujarati poet, writer and critic.
- Arvind Rathod - Film and Theatre actor
- Ravishankar Raval – a painter, art teacher, art critic, journalist, and essayist
- Somalal Shah – a painter
- Bharti Shiyal - Former Member of parliament and former National Vice president of BJP
- Gaurishankar Udayshankar, Chief minister-Regent of Bhavnagar 1870-1887 - for Takhtsinhji
- Jitu Vaghani, Education Minister Government of Gujarat

== See also ==
- Nishkalank Mahadev Temple
