= Dhundhsar =

Village in Gujarat, India

Coordinates: 21.541°N 71.918°E

Dhundhsar is a village located in Sihor Tehsil of Bhavnagar district in the State of Gujarat, India. The village is situated 25 km away from the sub-district headquarter Sihor and 48 km away from the district headquarter Bhavnagar. The nearest town to Dhundhsar is Palitana, which is approximately 12 km away.

According to the Census 2011 data, the village code or location code of Dhundhsar is 516409. It is identified as a gram panchayat. The total geographical area of the village spans 1129.04 hectares. Dhundhsar has a population of 3,296 individuals residing in approximately 517 houses.
