= Kajavadar =

Coordinates: 21°40′N 71°58′E

Kajavadar is a village in Sihor, Bhavnagar district, Gujarat, India.
