= Brahma Kund =

Coordinates: 21.7077229°N 71.9580028°E

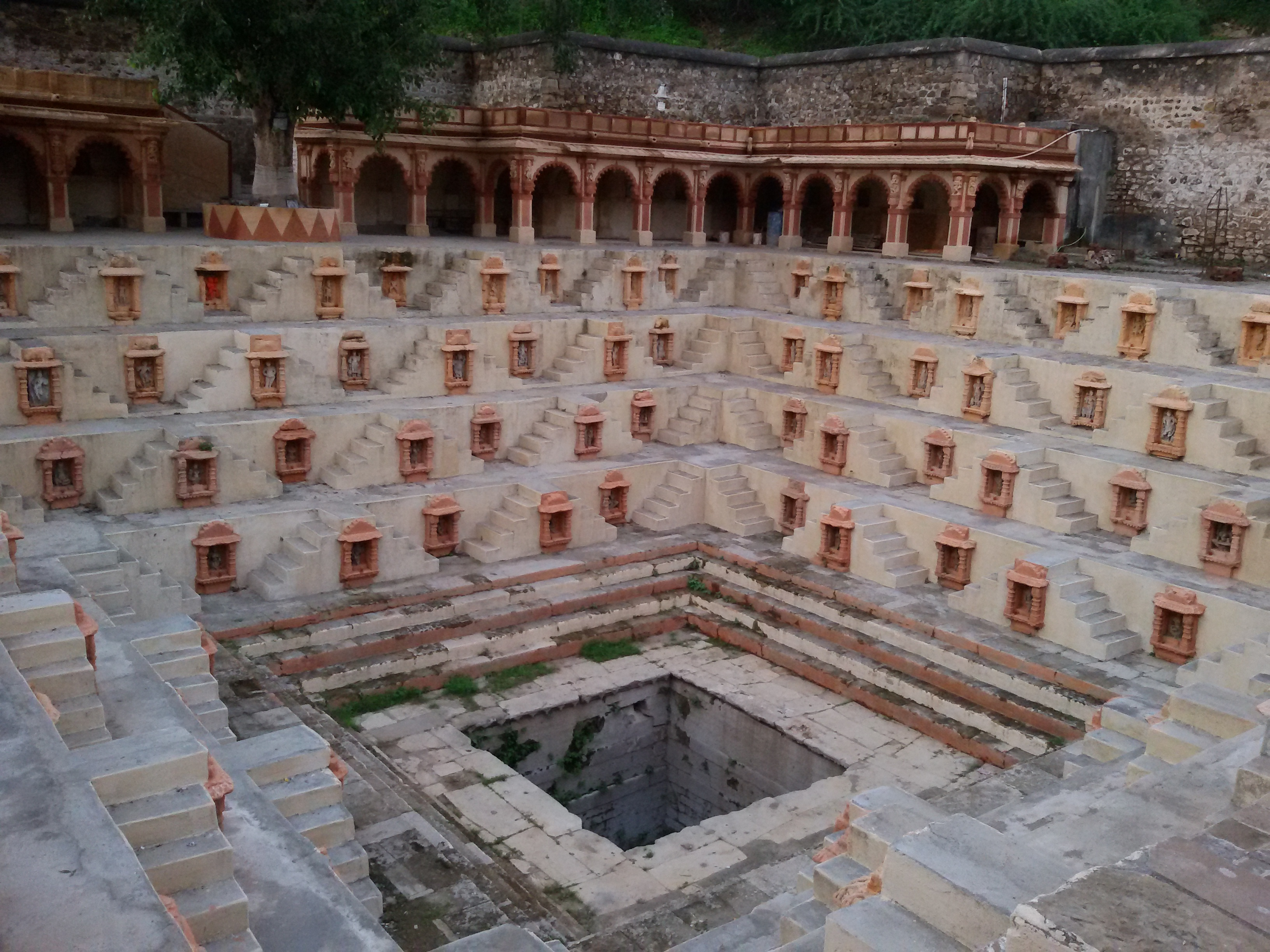
Brahmkund

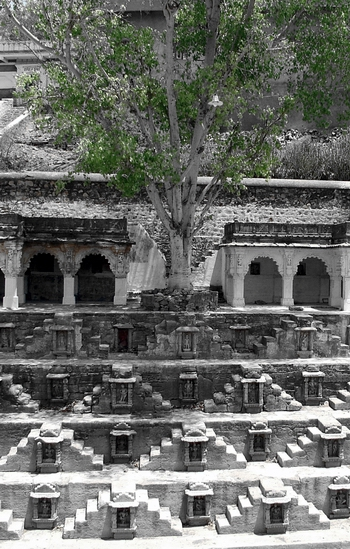
Brahma Kund

Brahma Kund (Note: There are several places in India where the tank known as Brahma Kund are located such as at Haridwar, at Pushkar, at Vrindavan and in Assam.) is a stepped temple tank in Sihor town of Bhavnagar district, Gujarat, India. It is located near the southern wall of the old town. It believed that it was constructed by Jayasimha Siddharaja.

== History ==
The exact dates of Brahma Kund is unknown. It mentioned in Skanda Purana.

According to legend, Chaulukya king Jayasimha Siddharaja was suffering from skin disease following the curse from Ranakadevi, the queen whom he captured from Junagadh. He was cured after bathing in this tank so he refurbished the tank. The water of the tank is still considered miraculous. It is mentioned in Prabandha-Chintamani written by Merutunga. The tank kept finding its reference and mentions citing Siddharaja since 12th century.

It is also mentioned in Ain-e-Akbari. Poet Nanalal Dalpatram Kavi expresses and explains in his Hari Samhita that Krishna had visited the place.

== Architecture ==
Brahma Kund, built in the style of medieval architecture, has a design of steps, small temples, metaphors, motifs and beliefs, idols of Hindu deities, stone work, some scientific entities, everything carved within and across the complex.

There is Neelkanth Mahadev temple near the tank. There is a lake known as Gautam Lake and Gautameshwar temple is located nearby.

The tank is the State Protected Monument (S-GJ-35). It is now poorly maintained.

== Culture ==
On the last day of Shraavana month, called as Bhadarvi Amas or Bhadrapad Amavasya, the fair is organised at the place which is attended by tens of thousands people.

== See also ==
- Brahma Vav
- Brahma Temple, Khedbrahma

== Notes and references ==
=== References ===
As of this edit, this article uses content from "Brahma Kund, Sihor and Siddharaj Jaisinh", which is licensed in a way that permits reuse under the Creative Commons Attribution-ShareAlike 3.0 Unported License, but not under the GFDL. All relevant terms must be followed.
