= Idar railway station =

Railway station in Gujarat, India

Idar

General information
- Location: Idar, Sabarkantha, Gujarat; India
- Coordinates: 23°50′10″N 73°00′41″E
- Elevation: 220 metres (720 ft)
- System: Indian Railways station
- Owner: Indian Railways
- Operator: Western Railway
- Line: Khedbrahma–Himatnagar–Ahmedabad line
- Platforms: 2
- Tracks: 4
- Connections: Auto stand

Construction
- Structure type: Standard (on ground)
- Parking: No

Other information
- Status: Functioning
- Station code: IDAR
- Zone(s): Western Railway
- Division(s): Ahmedabad
Location
- Location within India Location within Gujarat

Idar railway station is a small railway station in Sabarkantha district, Gujarat, India. Its code is IDAR. It serves Idar city. The station consists of two platforms. The platforms are not well sheltered. It lacks many facilities including water and sanitation. Idar lies on former metre-gauge track of Khedbrahma–Himatnagar–Ahmedabad. The line is closed since 2017.

== Major trains ==
- Khedbrahma–Ahmedabad MG Passenger (unreserved)
- Ahmedabad–Khedbrahma MG Passenger (unreserved)
