= History of stepwells in Gujarat =

Stepwells are wells in which the water is reached by steps. They are most commonly found in western India especially Gujarat where over 120 such wells are reported. The origin of the stepwell may be traced to reservoirs of the cities of the Indus Valley Civilisation such as Dholavira and Mohenjo-daro. Stepwells are a distinctive form of subterranean water resource and storage systems on the Indian subcontinent, and have been constructed since the 3rd millennium BC. The stepwells were constructed in the south western region of Gujarat around 600 AD. From there they spread north to Rajasthan and subsequently to north and western India. Construction activities accelerated during the tenth to 13th century during the Chaulukya and Vaghela periods. The construction of these stepwells hit its peak during the 11th to 16th century. The Muslim rulers of the 13th to 16th century did not disrupt the culture that was practiced in these stepwells and encouraged the building of stepwells. The wells lost their significance in the 19th century due to introduction of water pumps and pipe-systems.

== Ancient period ==
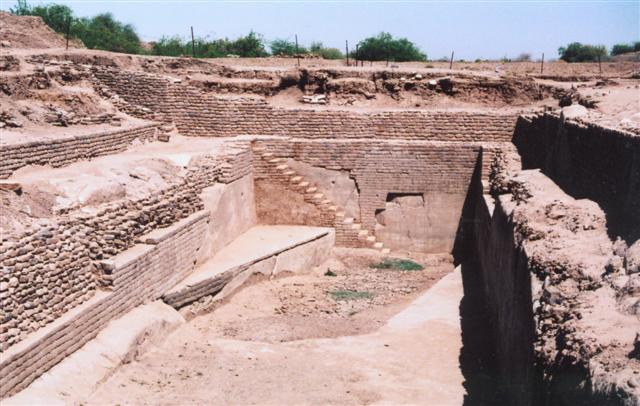
Water reservoir, with steps, at Dholavira

The stepped well may have originated to ensure water during drought periods. The water is considered sacred from the time of Vedas and the steps to reach the water level in artificially construed reservoirs can be found in the sites of Indus Valley Civilisation such as Dholavira and Mohenjo-daro.

== 2nd-10th century ==
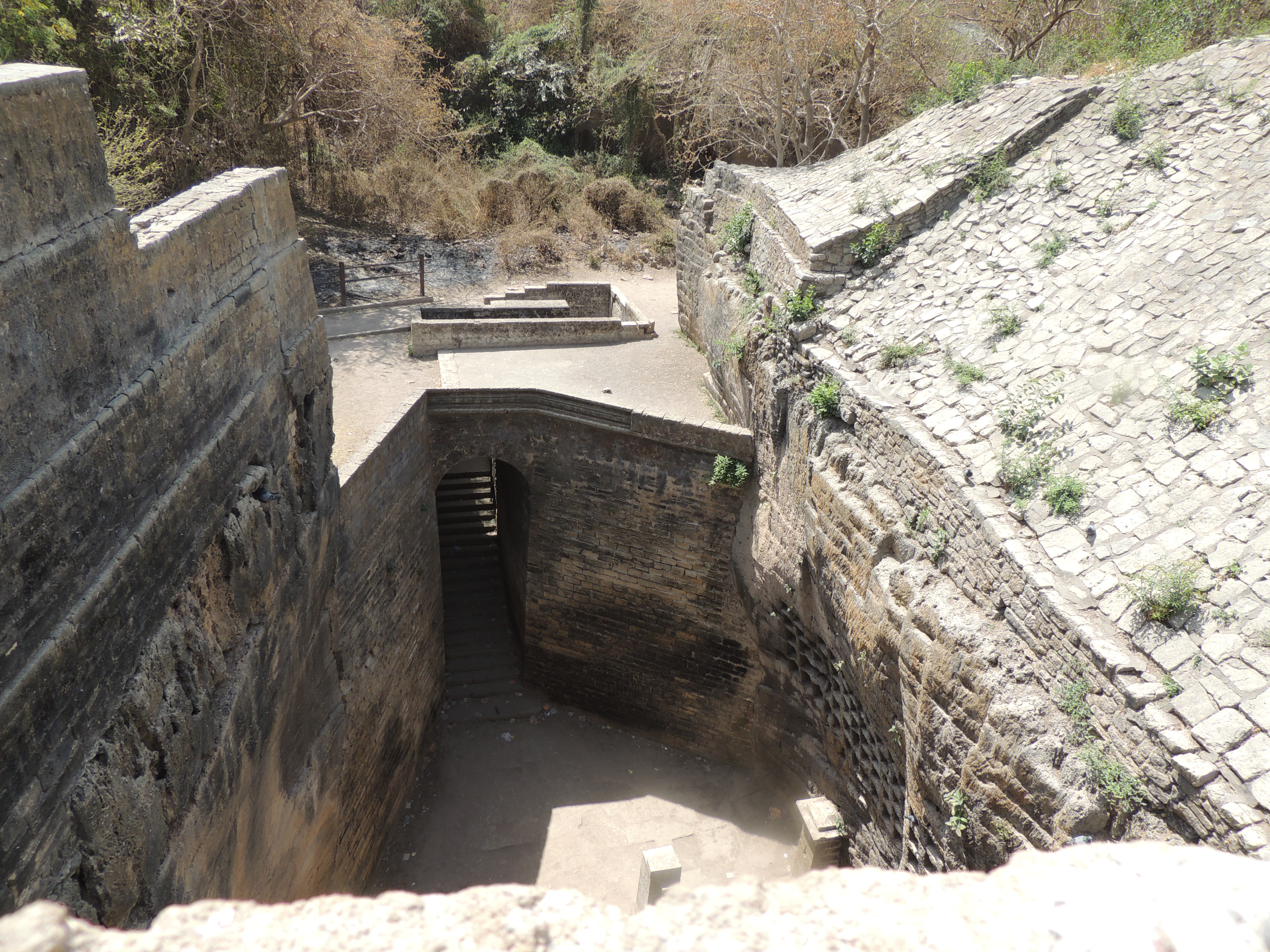
Navghan Kuvo

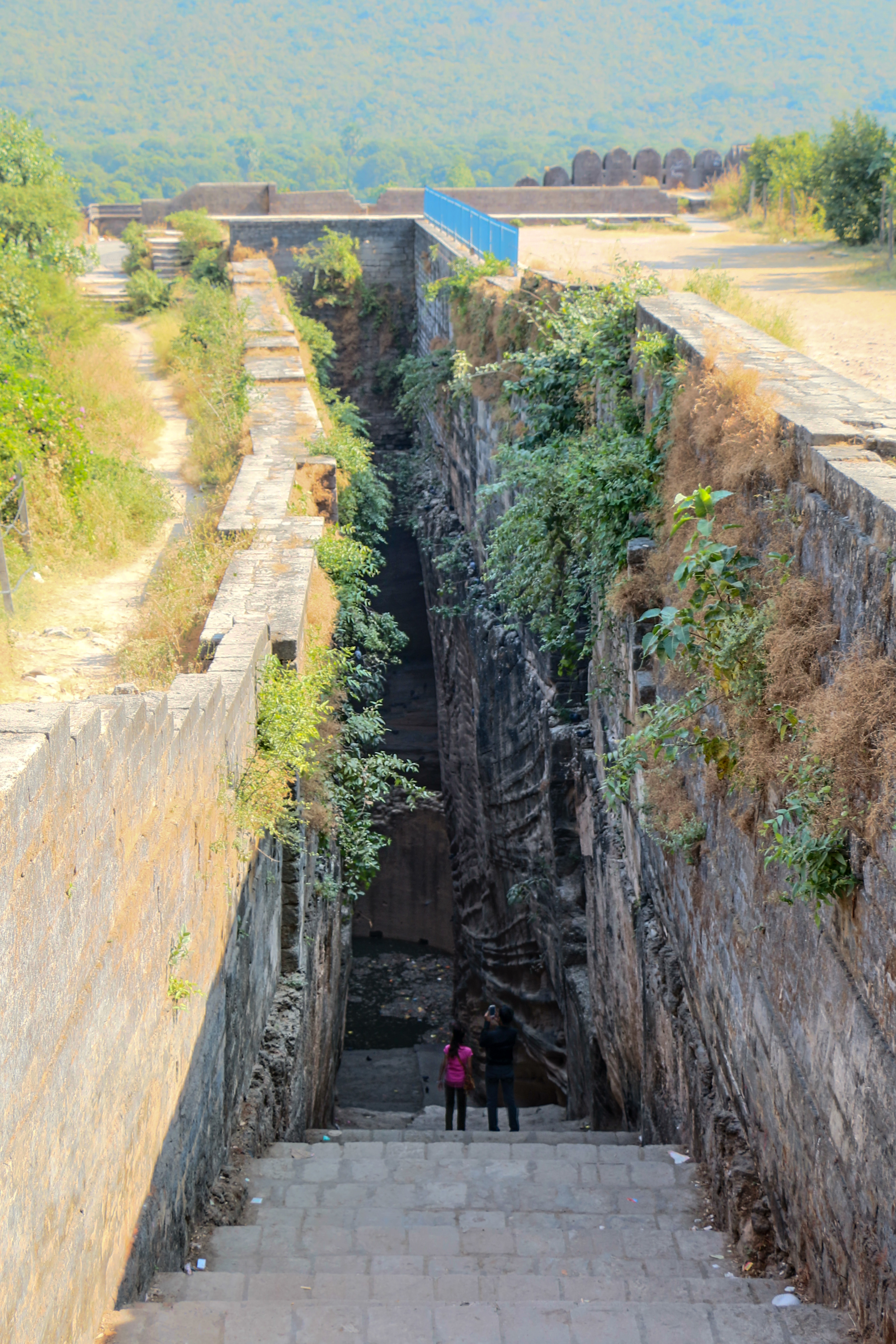
Adi Kadi Vav

The earliest example of a bath-like pond reached by steps is found at the Uparkot caves in Junagadh. These caves have been dated to the fourth century. Navghan Kuvo, a well with circular staircase, in the vicinity, is another example. It was possibly built in the Western Satrap (200-400 AD) or Maitraka (600-700 AD) period though some place it as late as the 11th century. The nearby Adi Kadi Vav is constructed either in the second half of the 10th century or 15th century.

The earliest stepwells are found at Dhank in Rajkot district of Gujarat; they are dated to the pre-Chalukyan period. The nearby Bochavdi stepwell near Bochavdi Nes in Alech hills is slightly earlier than two other stepwells in Dhank. These are the Jhilani stepwell dated to 600 AD and the Manjushri stepwell dated to the early seventh century based on their Saurastra style architecture.

== 10th-12th century ==
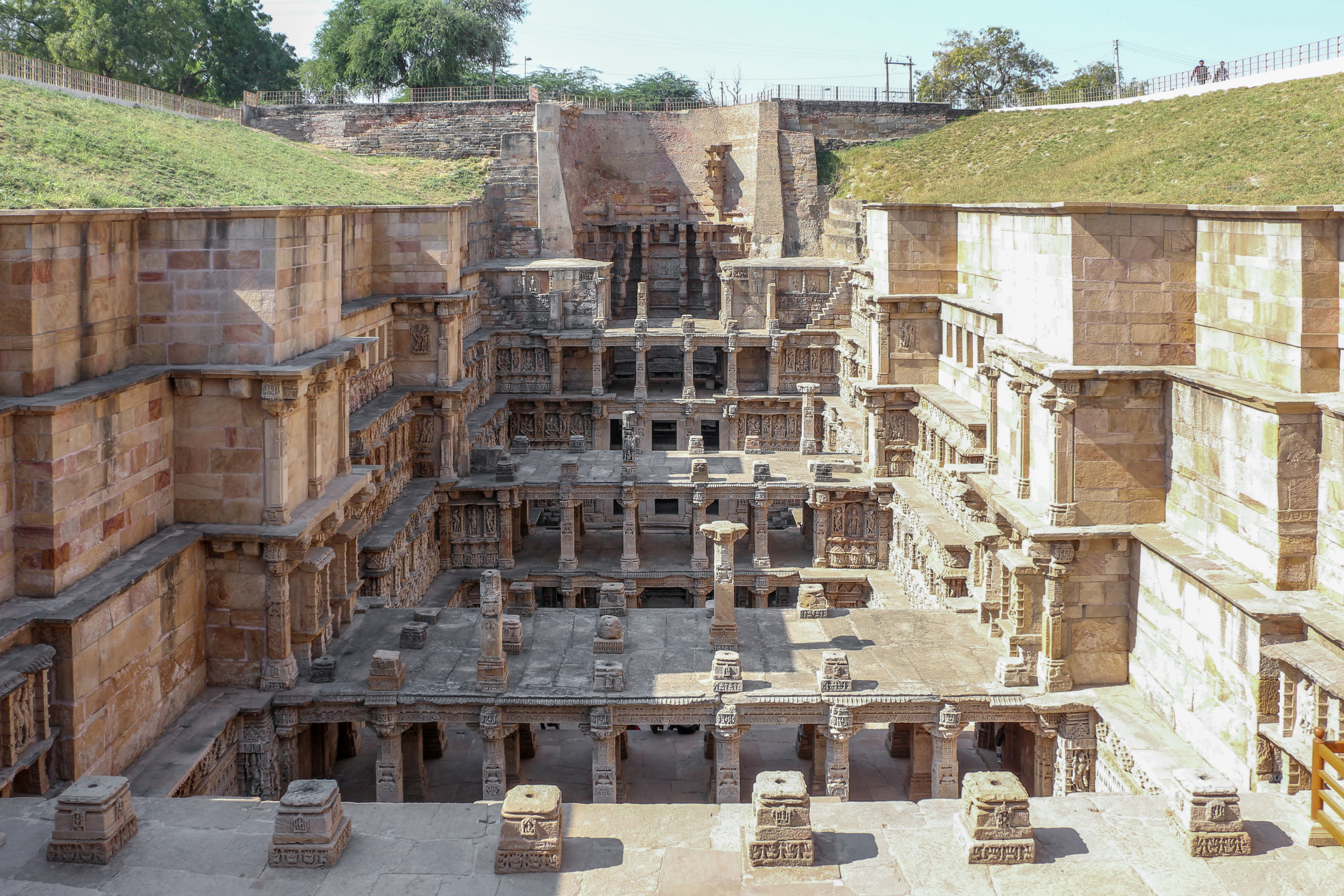
Rani ki vav

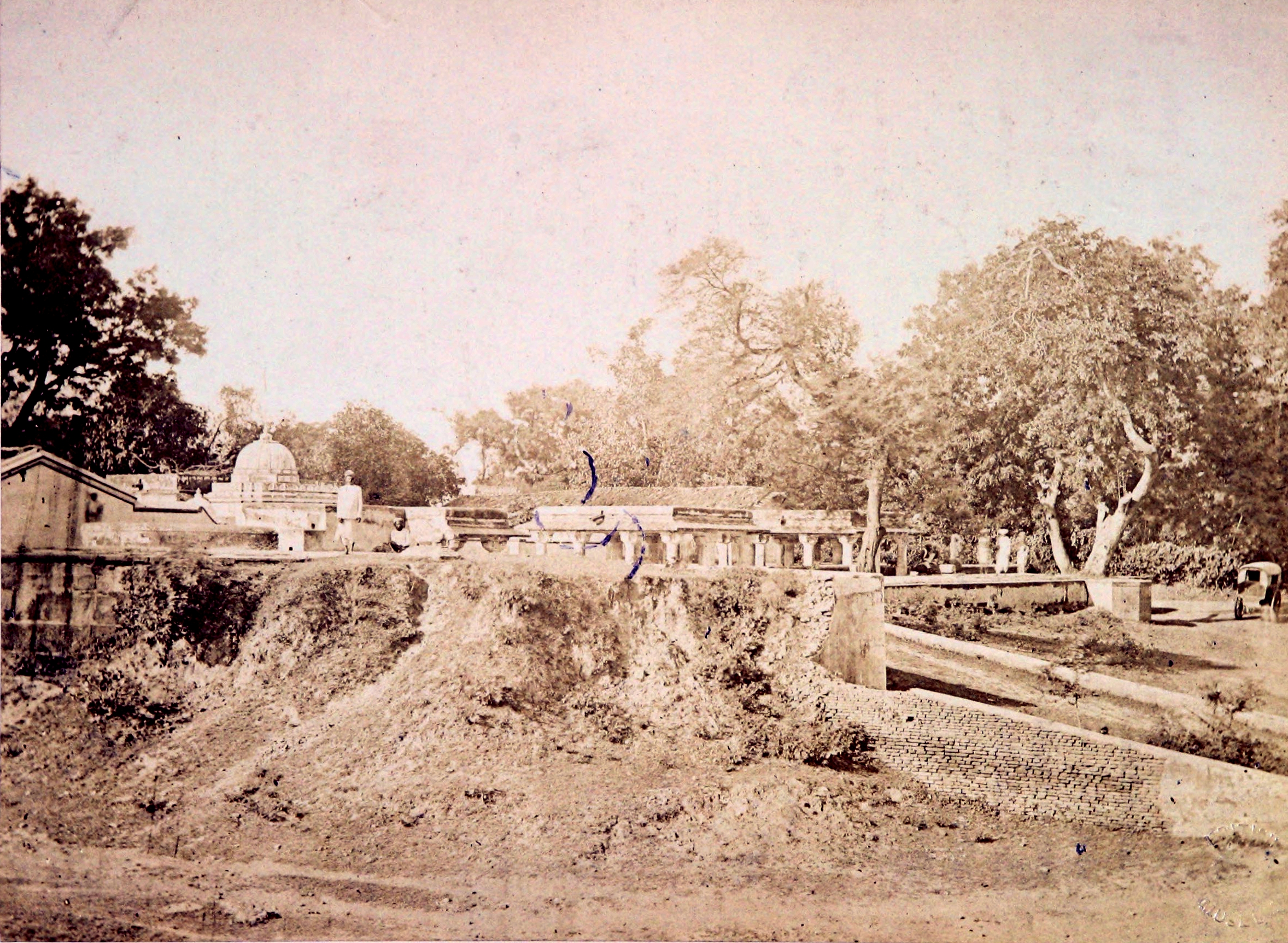
Mata Bhavani's Stepwell, Ahmedabad, 1866

The stepwell as a form of artistic architecture started during the Chaulukya period. The stepwell situated west of kund of Modhera Sun Temple may belong to the 11th century whereas the mandapa above ground is from the 10th century. The Rani ki vav (the Queen's stepwell) of Patan was constructed around 1050 AD. Ankol Mata stepwell at Davad and Mata Bhavani's Stepwell in Ahmedabad belonged to the third quarter of the 11th century.

Several stepwells are ascribed to Minaldevi, the mother of Chaulukya ruler Jayasimha Siddharaja. The lake in Viramgam and a stepwell in Nadiad are ascribed to her. The Minal stepwell in Balej village in Sabarkantha district is ascribed to her and was built in 1095 AD (Samvat 1152). Another Minaldevi Vav in Virpur in Rajkot district is also ascribed to her and has stylistic affinities to Chaulukya architecture. Asapuri stepwell of Ahmedabad and the stepwell of Jhinjhuwada are of the 12th century. The Chaumukhi stepwell of Chobari in Surendranagar district depicts religious figures similar to nearby temples. The stepwell in Dhandhalpur is ascribed to Jayasimha Siddharaja. During the reign of Kumarapala in the 12th century, several stepwells were constructed. The stepwell at Vayad near Patan was built during this time. Ganga stepwell at Wadhwan has been dated to 1169 AD (Samvat 1225).

During the later years of the Chaulukya period, construction slowed down due to political unrest. The Vikia and Jetha stepwells near Navlakha Temple, Ghumli near the Barda hills belonged to the 13th century. The Gyan stepwell near Visavada village in the Barda hills is ascribed to the time of Bhima II. The ruined stepwell of nearby Keshav village is of the same period.

== 12th-13th century ==
The Ra Khengar stepwell between Vanthali and Junagadh is stated to be constructed by Tejapala of the Vastupala-Tejapala, the brother-ministers in Vaghela court. It belongs to the early Vaghela period. Visaldev of Vaghela dynasty built the stepwell along with gates and temples at Dabhoi, completed in 1255. The Satmukhi stepwell in Dabhoi is a temple built over a tank with seven wells ascribed to him.

The Madhavav in Wadhwan was built in 1294 AD (Vikram Samvat 1350) by Nagar Brahmin Madha and Keshav, the ministers in court of the last Vaghela ruler Karna. The Batris Kotha stepwell in Kapadvanj may have belonged to the 13th century due to its similarity with the Madha and Vikia stepwells.

== 14th-15th century ==
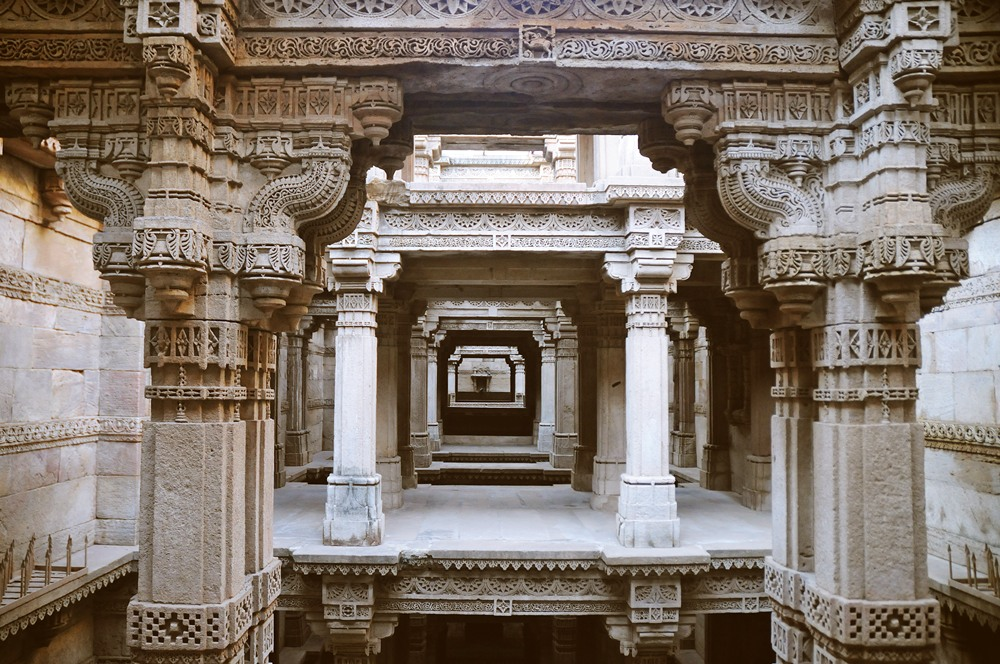
Adalaj Stepwell

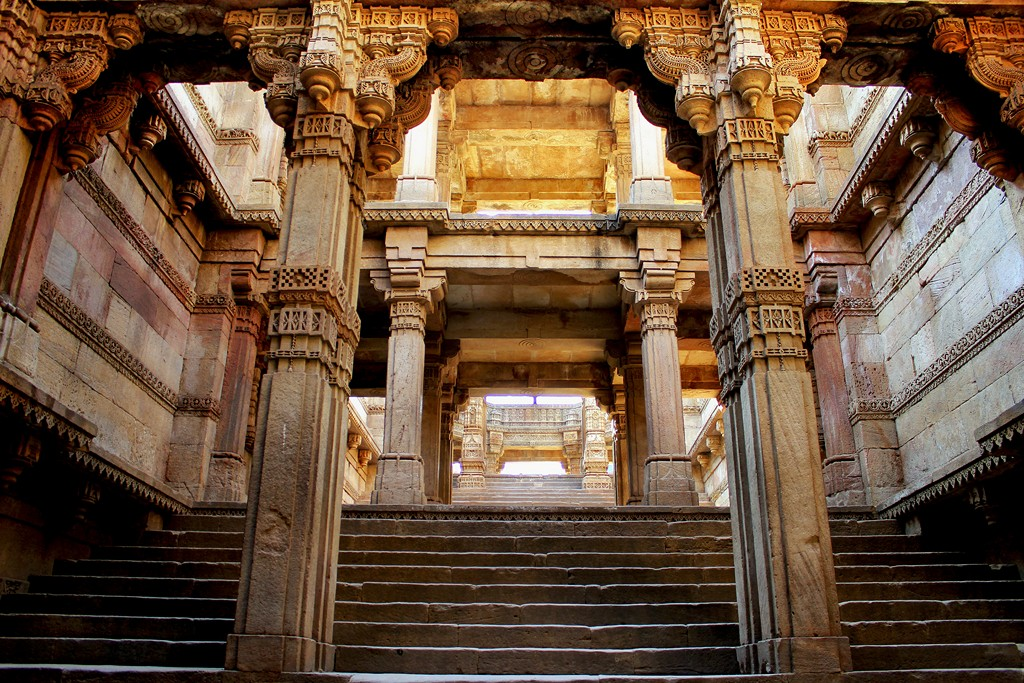
Dada Harir Stepwell

A large number of stepwells were constructed in the 14th century. Sodhali stepwell in Mangrol was built in 1319 AD (V. S. 1375) by Vali Sodhala of Modha caste. The Brahma Vav near the Brahma temple of Khedbrahma belonged to the 14th century judged by its style.

The Suda stepwell in Mahuva (1381 AD), Hani stepwell in Dhandhusar (1389–1333 AD) and Siddhnath Mahadev stepwell in Dholka were built during Tughluq rule in Gujarat. The stepwell of Sampa near Ahmedabad was built in 1328 AD. The Rajba stepwell of Rampura near Wadhwan and the Wadhwani stepwell in Khambhat were built in 1483 and 1482 respectively based on the earlier Madha stepwell of Wadhwan. The Dada Harir Stepwell was built in 1499 by the harem lady of Mahmud Begada. The two stepwells in Kaleshwari-Ni Nal near Lunawada belongs to 14-15th century but the iconography in it belongs to 10th century.

During this period, the religious aspect of stepwells lost its significance. The stepwell of Sodali village near Mahemdavad and the stepwell in Mahemdavad itself, both of which belonged to the 15th century rule of Mahmud Begada, are its example. The two stepwells found in and around Vadodara are of the 15th century; one is near Sewasi village (V. S. 1537) and the other is the Navalakhi stepwell (1405 AD) of Laxmi Vilas Palace.

The Adalaj Stepwell was constructed by Rudabai in 1499 AD. A nearby stepwell in Chhatral also belongs to the same period.

== 16th-18th century ==
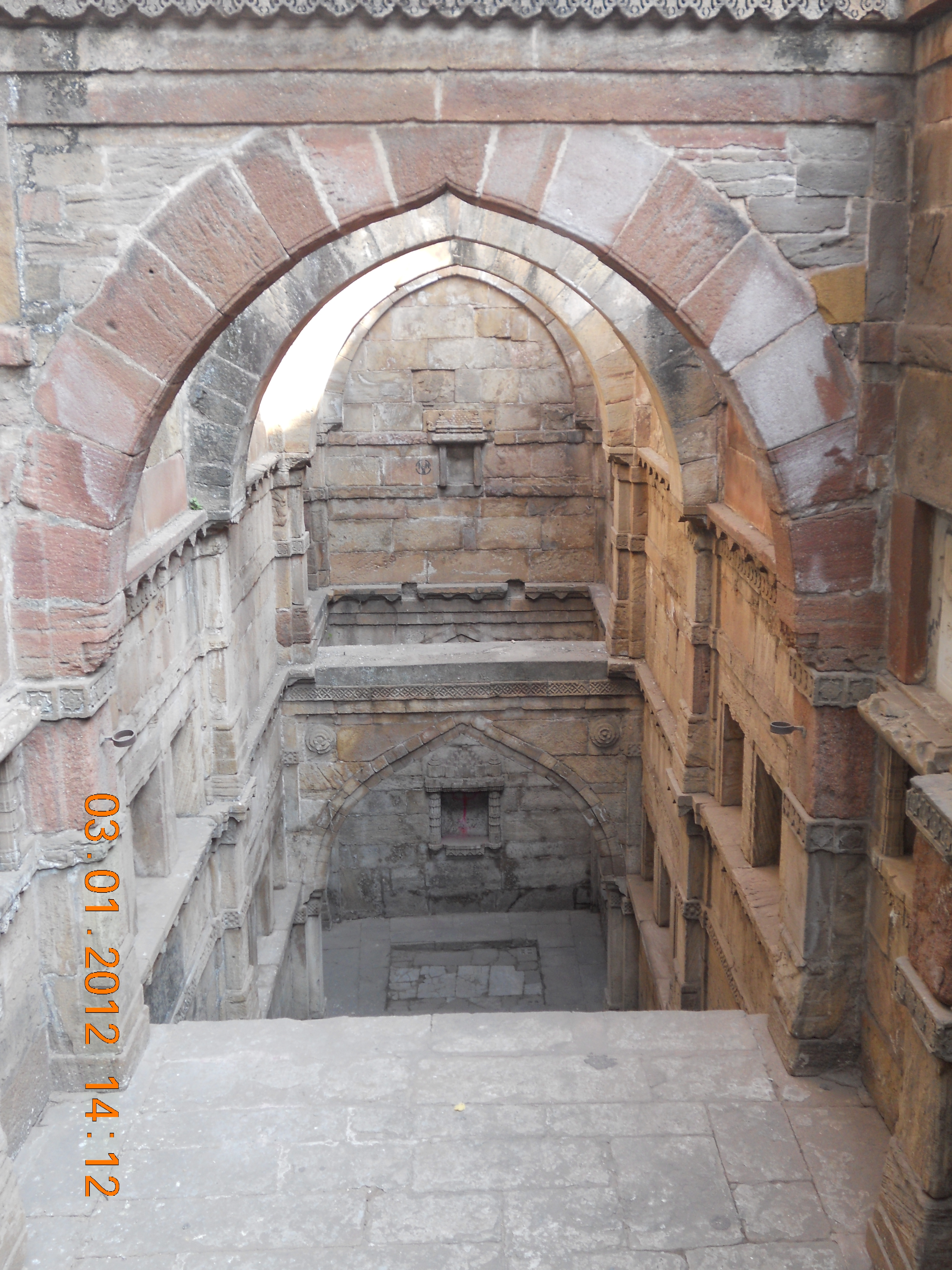
Amritavarshini Vav

The Nagabawa stepwell in Dhrangdhra (1525 AD) and Jiva Mehta stepwell in Morbi are of the same style and period. The stepwell of Roho (1560 AD) was built by Champa, the wife of Raja Shri Nanaji and her daughter. There are also important stepwells in Palanpur and Jhinjhuwada.

Several stepwells are plain in design without any ornamentation which makes it difficult to ascertain their period, but they may belong to the 16th or 17th century. Such stepwells are in Hampur and Idar, as well as the Matri Vav in Kankavati and Gyaneshwari stepwell in Modhera. The stepwell of Mandva in north Gujarat is similar to that of Mahemdavad so may belong to that period. The Sindhvai Mata stepwell in Patan has an inscription dating to 1633 AD. The Ravli stepwell of Mangrol is of the 17th century. The stepwell in Limboi near Idar has Chaulukya style ornamentation and has been dated to 1629 AD.

The Amritavarshini Vav in Ahmedabad, completed in 1723, is L-shaped.

== 19th-20th century ==
The authorities during the British Raj found the hygiene of the stepwells less than desirable and installed pipe and pump systems to replace their purpose. Jethabhai's Stepwell in Isanpur, Ahmedabad was completed in the 1860s for irrigation. The stepwell of Wankaner palace was built by erstwhile rulers in the 1930s as a cool place of retreat for the royal family. It was built in white sandstone and is the last monument of its kind.

Due to waterpumps and pipe-systems, the stepwells lost their significance and due to economic cost, they were not constructed thereafter.

== See also ==
- Ancient
  - Sanitation of the Indus Valley Civilisation
  - History of water supply and sanitation
- Important water resource topics of India
  - Water conservation in India
- Other related
  - Architecture of Gujarat
  - Boter Kothani Vav
