= Brahma Vav =

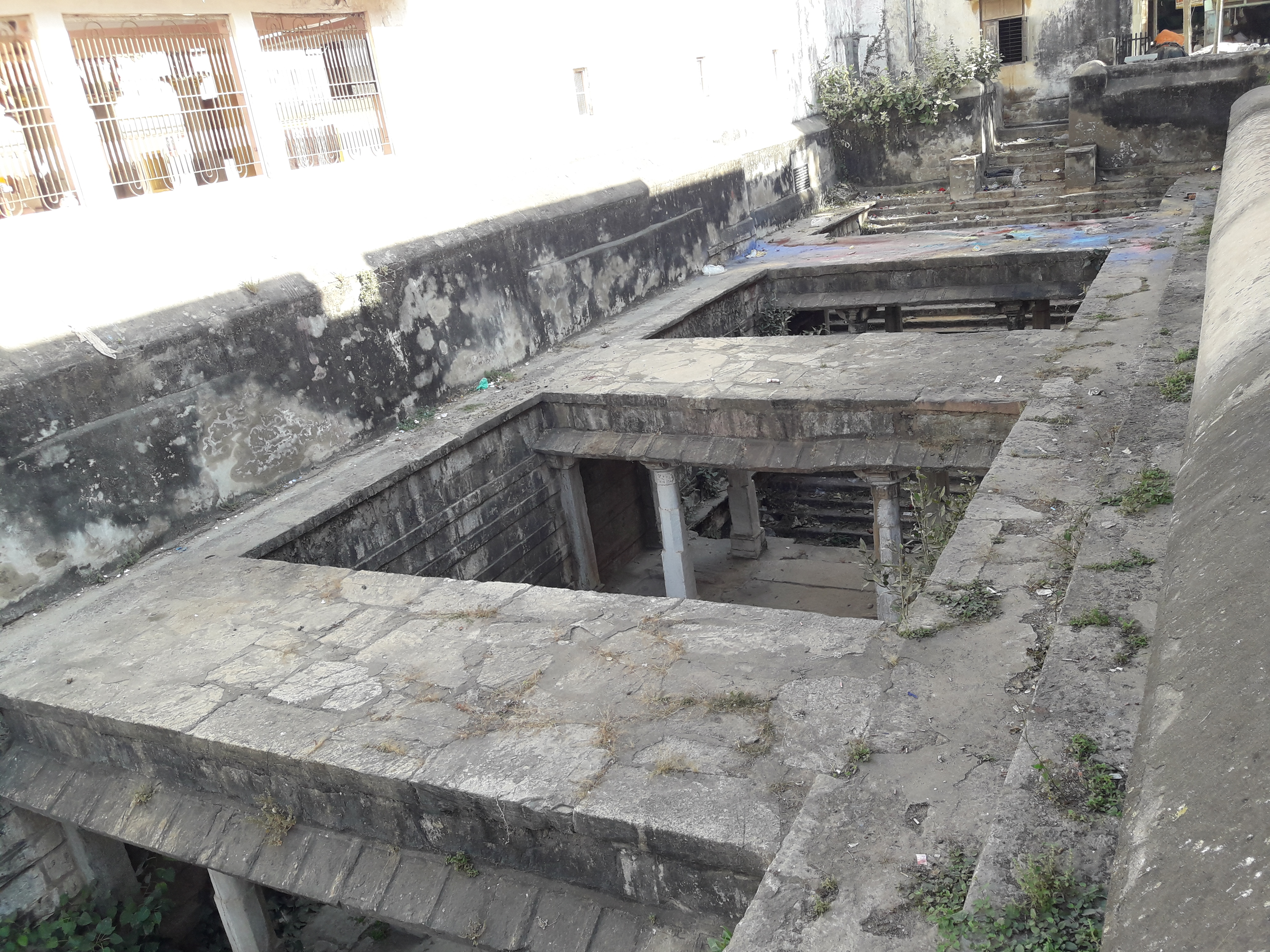
- Stepwell from outside
- Interactive map of the Brahma Vav area

General information
- Type: Stepwell
- Architectural style: Indian architecture
- Location: Brahmaji Chowk, Khedbrahma, Gujarat, India
- Coordinates: 24.0386°N 73.0481°E
- Completed: 14th century

Design and construction
- Architect: Local
- Designations: ASI State Protected Monument No. S-GJ-326

Brahma Vav is a stepwell in Khedbrahma, Gujarat, India. It was built in 14th century.

== History ==
The stepwell is situated opposite the Brahma temple. Based on ornamentation of the miniature shrines in the stepwell, it is dated to 14th century. There is no inscription in the stepwell to ascertain its age.

There are some paliya (hero stone) dedicated to Dhabi gatekeepers of the village who died fighting Maharaja Shivsinhji of Idar around Samvat 1800. The inscriptions on them are worn out.

Humada Digambara Jains and Khedaval Brahmins consider the stepwell sacred and used to worship their patron deities in it.

== Architecture ==
The stepwell is built with grey granite stone. It is constructed in east–west direction; the entrance is in the east and the well is in the west. It is 38.10 metres (125.0 ft) long; 30 metres (98 ft) of stepped corridor and the well of 8.10 metres (26.6 ft) diameter. The stepwell becomes narrower as one goes downwards and to the well. It has four kuta (pavilion-towers) where fourth is attached to the well. The breadth is 8.50 metres (27.9 ft) (including parapet wall) and 6.60 metres (21.7 ft) (without parapet wall) at the entrance which decreases to 5.4 metres (18 ft) in second kuta and 3.90 metres (12.8 ft) in the third kuta. It had row of miniature shrines as an ornamentation in the wall of shaft of the stepwell which suggests it was built in 14th century. They resemble temple spires and has niches. It has 27 niches without any idols now. It is now in despair due to lack of maintenance.

== See also ==
- Brahma Kund
- Rani ki vav
- History of stepwells in Gujarat
