= Brahma Temple, Khedbrahma =

Hindu temple dedicated to Brahma in Gujarat, India

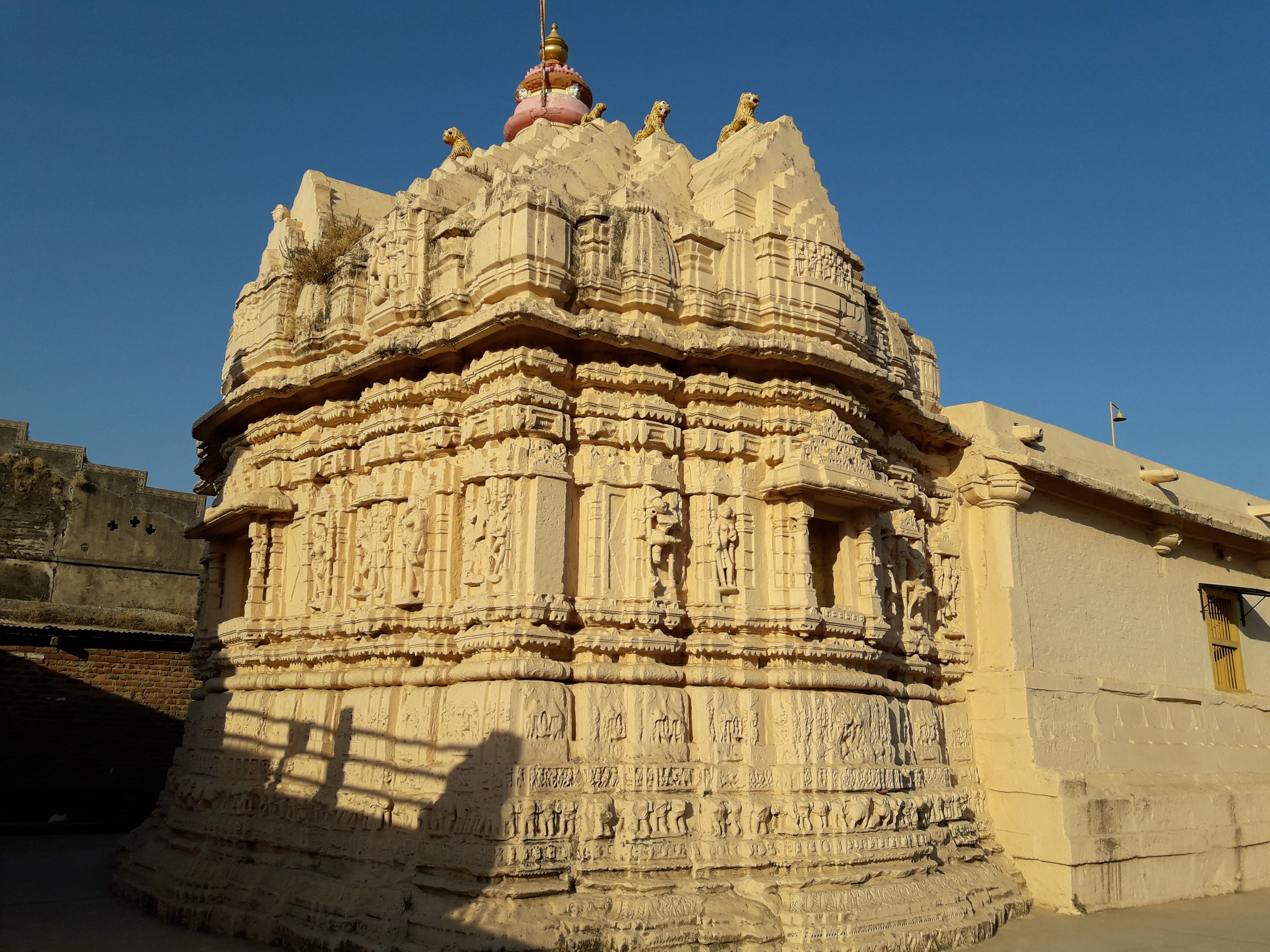
- Exterior of the temple

- Location in Gujarat

Religion
- Affiliation: Hinduism
- Deity: Brahma

Location
- Location: Khedbrahma, Sabarkantha district
- State: Gujarat
- Country: India
- Interactive map of Brahma Temple, Khedbrahma
- Coordinates: 24.03828°N 73.04822°E

Architecture
- Type: Maru-Gurjara architecture
- Completed: c. 1060
- Temple: 1

Brahma Temple or Brahmaji Mandir is a Hindu temple dedicated to Brahma in Khedbrahma, Gujarat, India. It was built in the late 11th century.

== History ==
The temples dedicated to Brahma are uncommon in India. According to M. A. Dhaky, it was built in third quarter of the 11th century during the reign of Chaulukya king Karna.

== Architecture ==
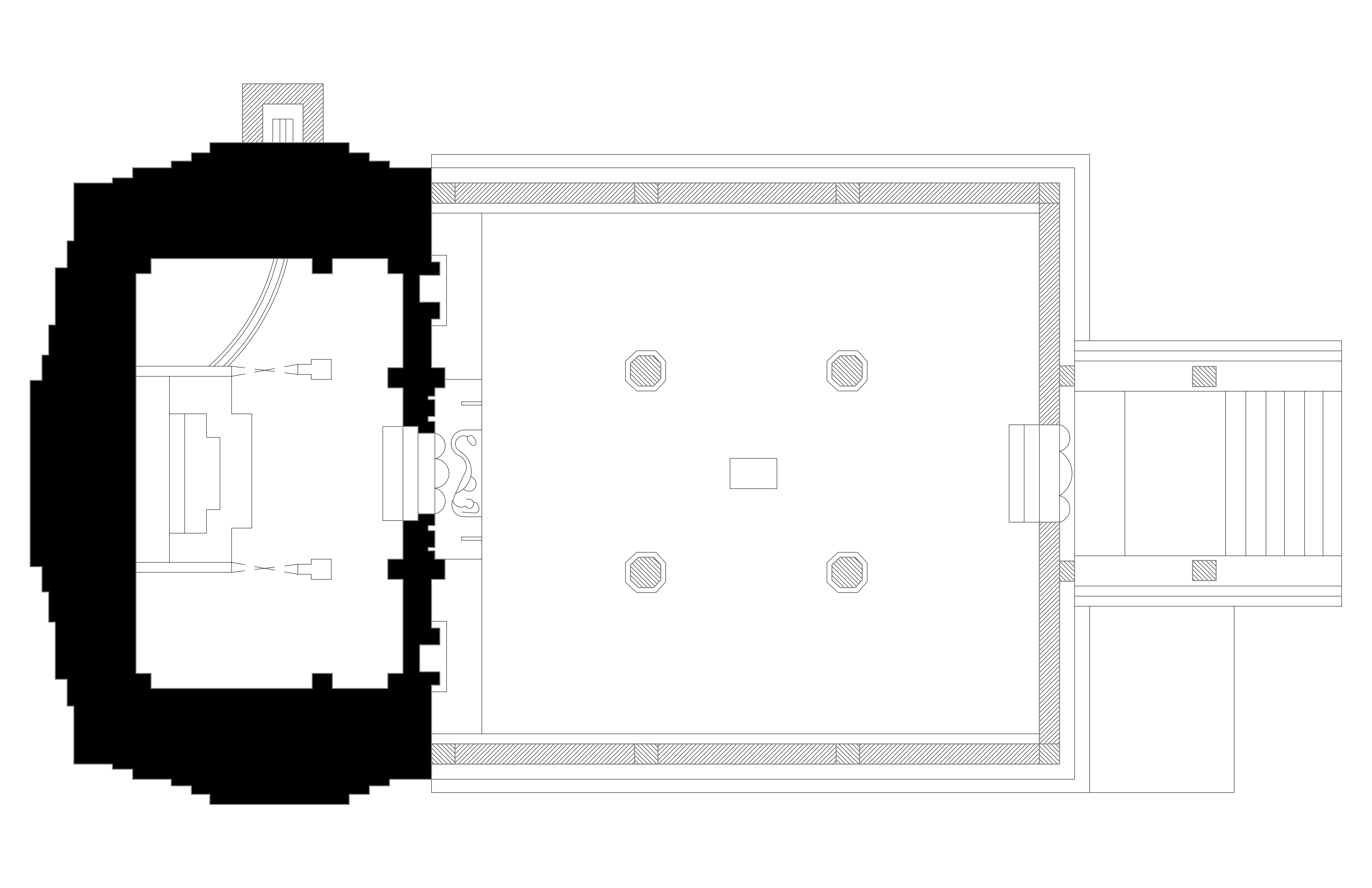
Plan of the temple

The east facing Brahma temple is situated in the middle of the village.

The spire, mandapa (dome) and doorway must have been destroyed and rebuilt later in bricks and mortar. It is built of white sandstone and cement-covered bricks. It is 57 feet long, 30 feet broad, and 36 feet high. The sanctum is 32 feet wide which is navaratha in anga and hastangula in plan and is of fully decorated class. Its pitha (base), the vedibandha and the mandovara (middle part of the wall) is resemble to the temple at Sunak. The lower part of main shrine is intact and is filled with images of gods, goddesses and apsaras. These images in jangha portion are poorly retouched. The chauri-bearers on nandika are elegantly carved which are common in 11th century temples. The phansana roof resembles Vimala Vasahi temple and is crowned with a ghanta. There are images of Brahma in the niches on the three sides. The modern mandapa hall has four pillars reused from the original mandapa. They are octagonal and has carvings of bells and chains with band of kirtimukha faces on the top. The doorway can be original or the modern one. It has floral patterns and minor sculptures. The dedicatory block in the centre has Ganesha.

The interior has no ornamental carvings. The image of three-faced and four-armed standing Brahma is 1.8 m (5 ft 11 in) high. There are goose on either sides of the image. The image seems later installation or the older image plaster with cement to merge broken parts.

== Gallery ==
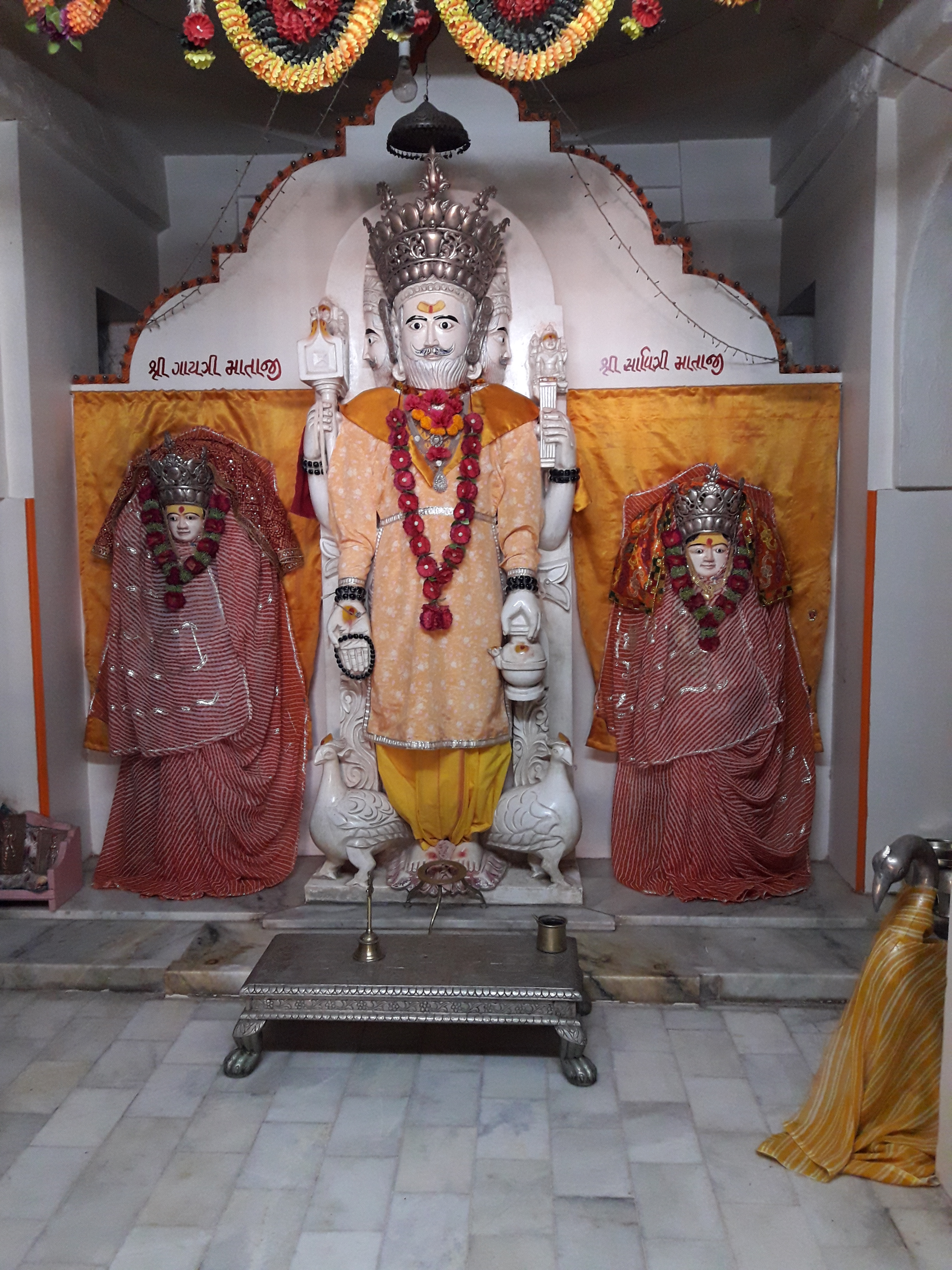
Idol of Brahma and his two consorts Gayatri and Savitri

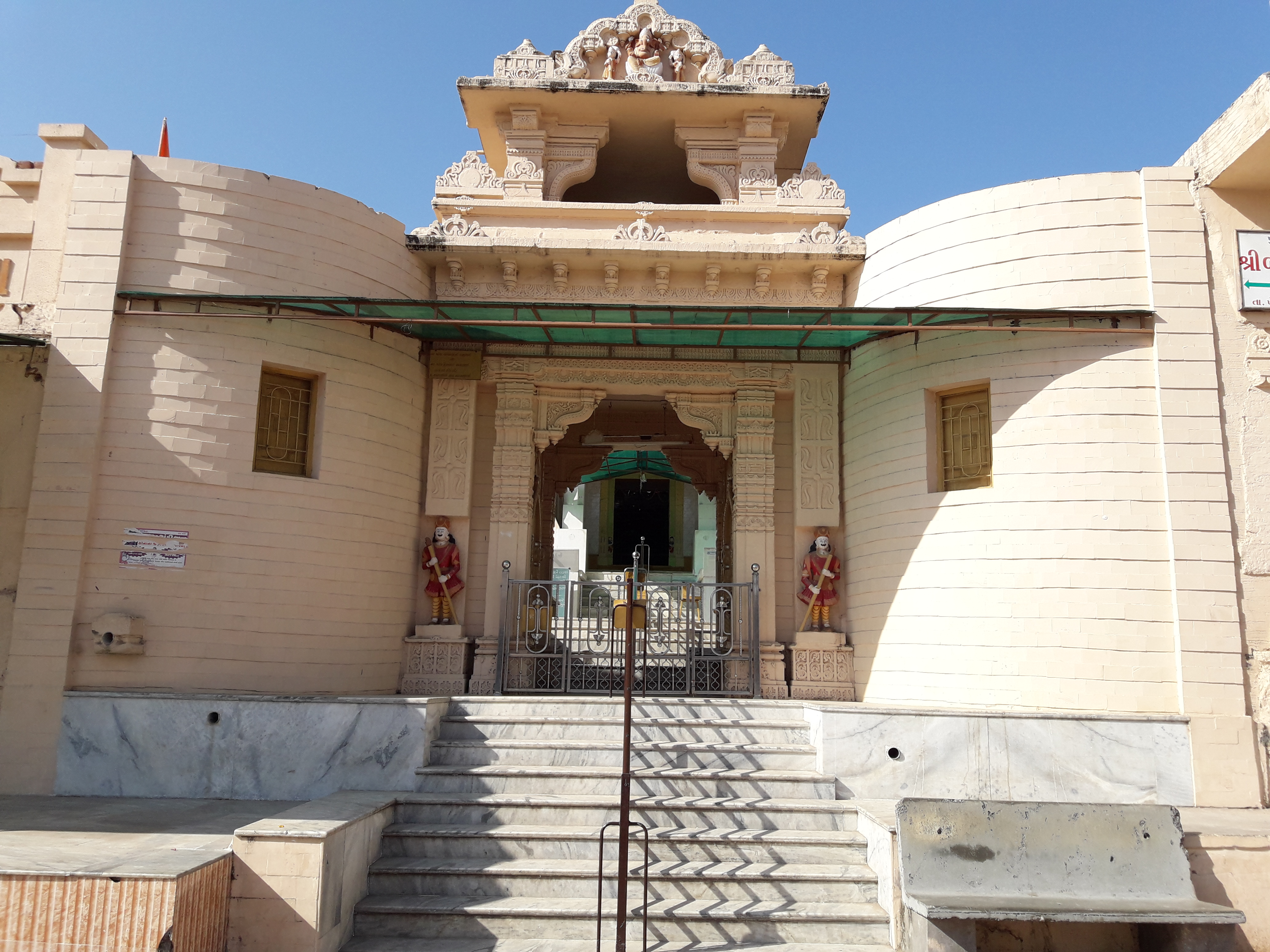
Entrance

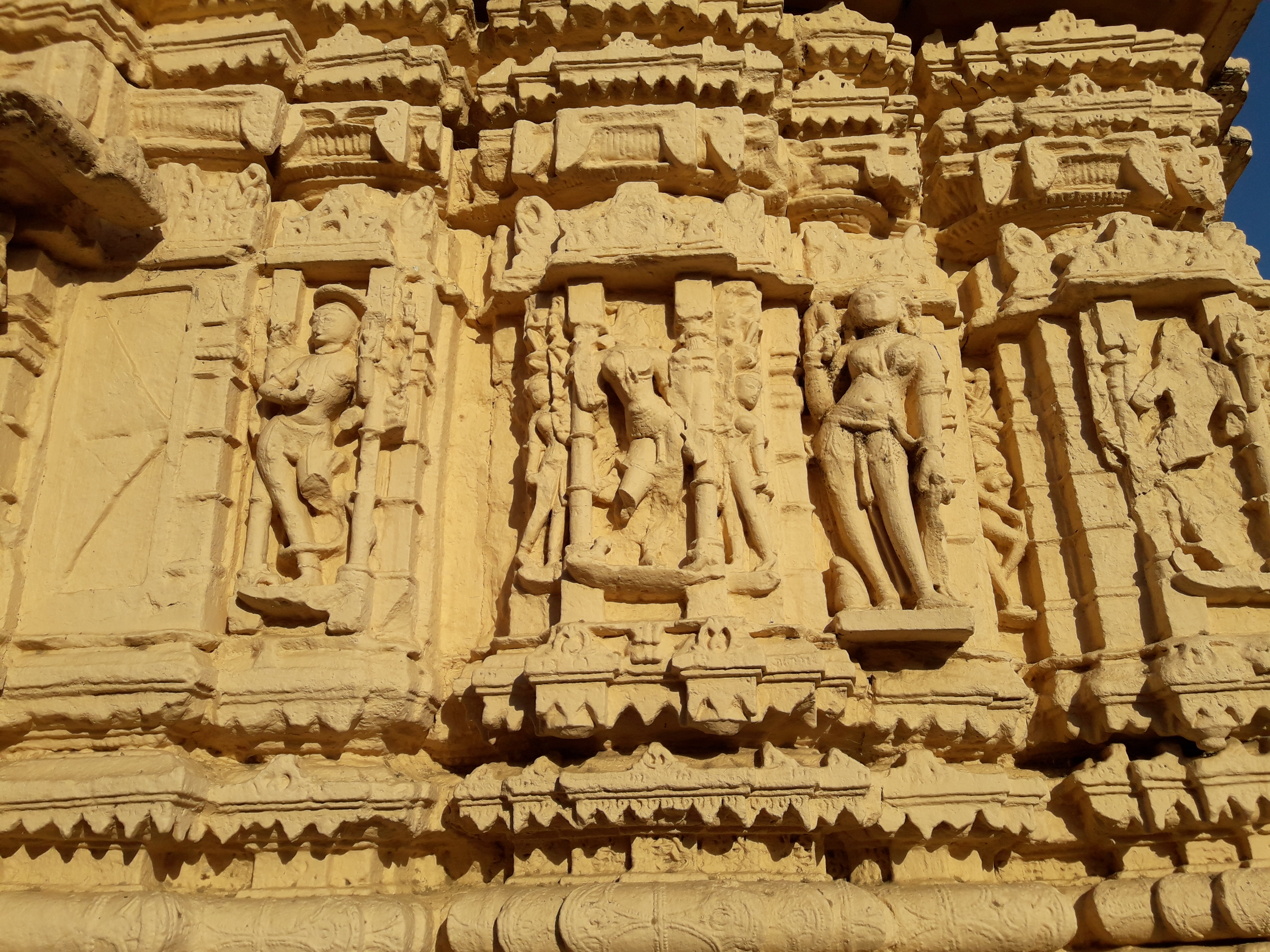
Exterior

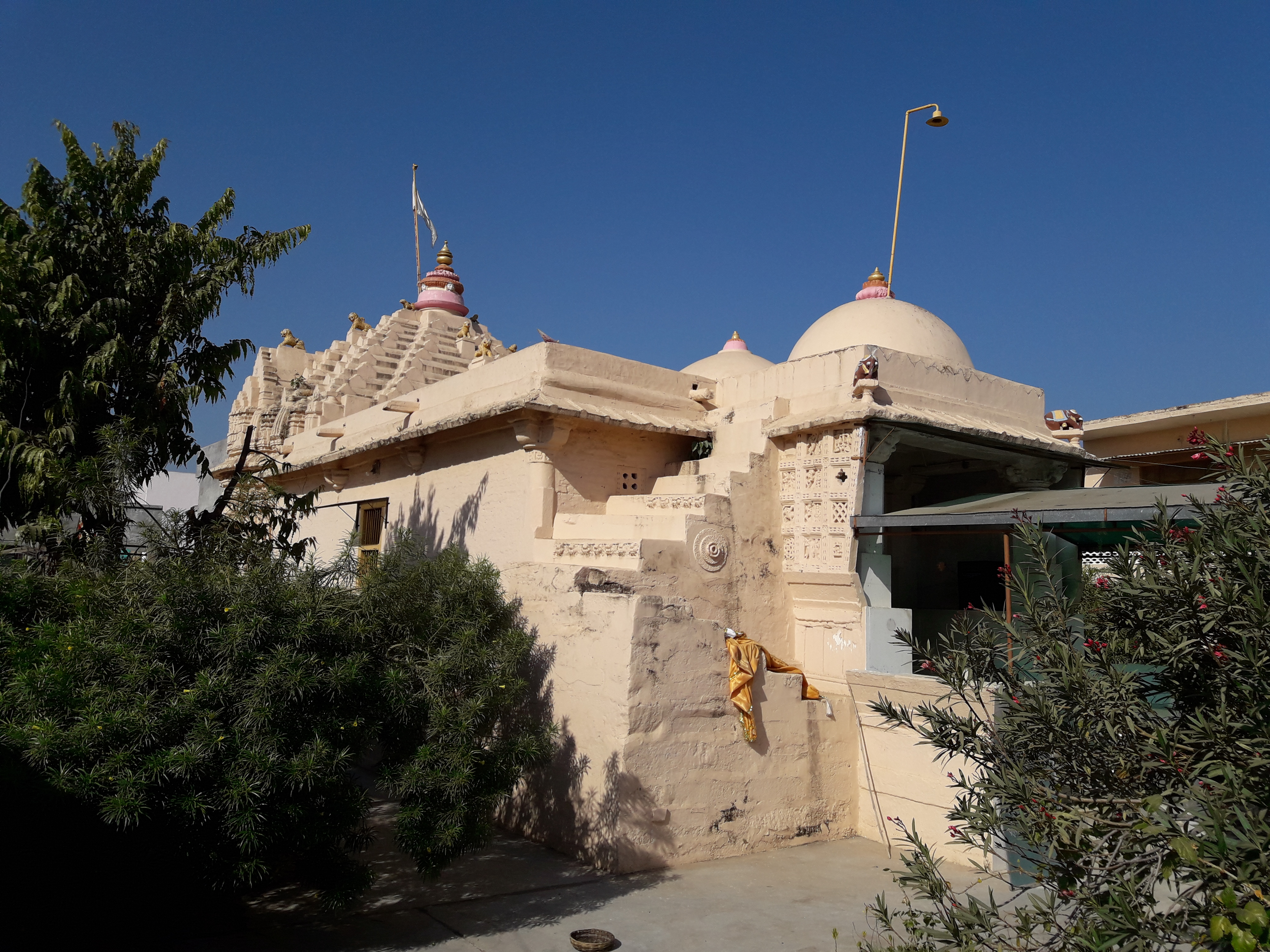
Mandapa of the temple

== See also ==
- Brahma Vav
