= Khedbrahma =

- Town
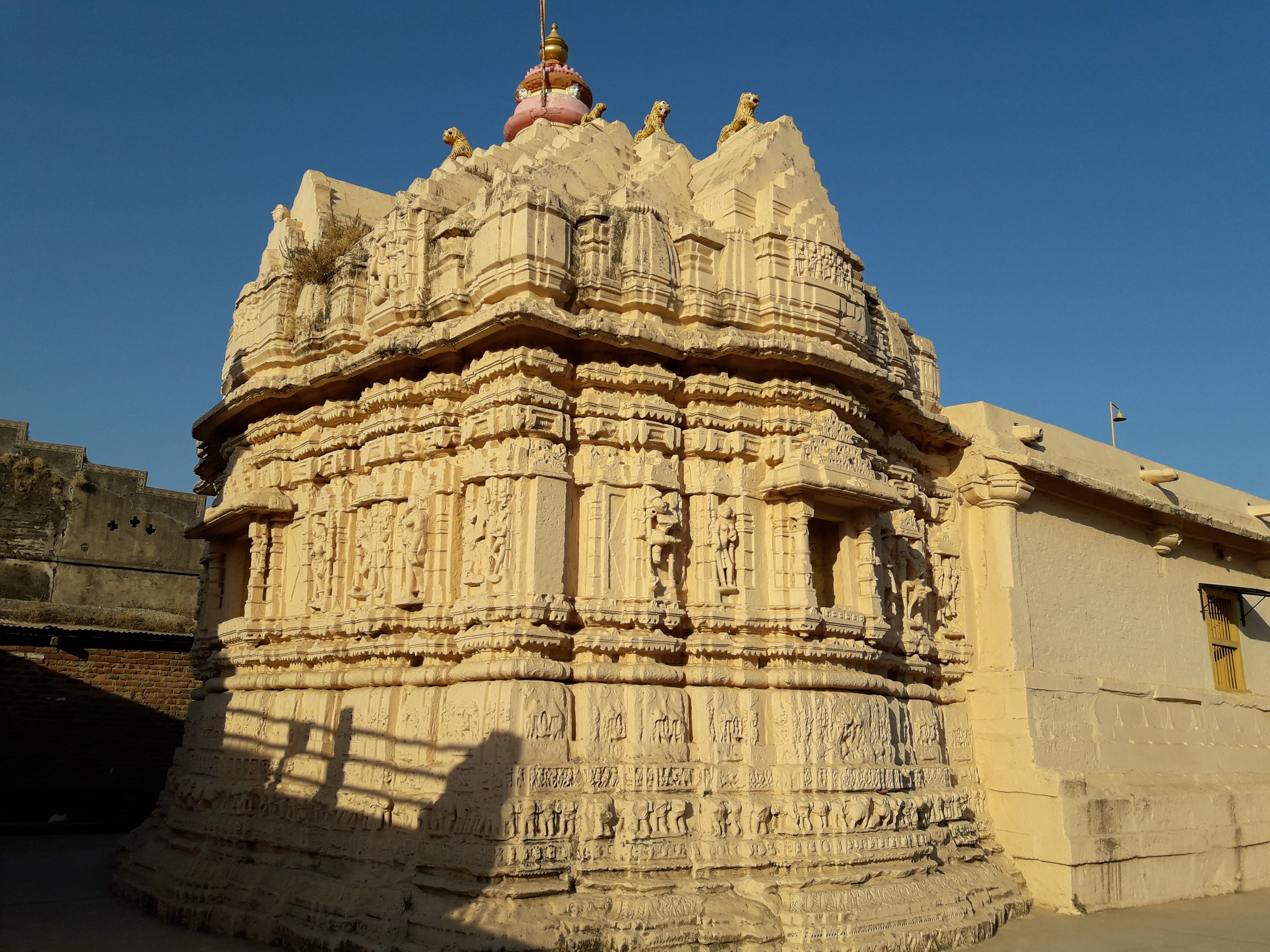
- Brahma Temple, built c. 1060 AD.
- Interactive map of Khedbrahma
- Location in Gujarat, India Khedbrahma (India)
- Coordinates: 24°1′42″N 73°2′29″E
- Country: India
- State: Gujarat
- District: Sabarkantha district
- Named for: Brahma

Government
  - Body: Nagar Palika
- Elevation: 202 m (663 ft)

Population (2011)
  - Total: 25,001

Languages
  - Official: Gujarati, Hindi
- Time zone: UTC+5:30 (IST)
- PIN: 383255
- Area code: +91 2775
- Vehicle registration: starting with GJ 9
- Sex ratio: 1000/916 ♂/♀

Khedbrahma is a town and a taluka headquarter in Khedbrahma Taluka of Sabarkantha district, Gujarat, India. It is situated on the banks of Harnav river. The town is connected with religious history and has been pilgrim site for centuries. The 11th century Brahma, Ambika and Pankhnath Mahadev temples are the oldest monuments of the town. The town has an old stepwell, the Brahma Vav. It was under Parmaras, Chaulukyas and Pariharas before it came under Idar State in 13th century.

== Etymology ==
Brahmakshetra Mahatmaya mentions that Brahma had established the town so the region was known as Brahmakshetra, the land of Brahma. He ploughed the land here and a river had flown out of it which was later known as Harnav, a corruption of Hiranyaganga which was named after Hiranyagarbha, another name of Brahma. According to the inscription (Samvat 1256) in Aditi stepwell; the place was known as Brahmapur in Satya Yuga (1st age), Agnikhet in Treta Yuga (2nd age), Hiranyapur in Dvapara Yuga (3rd age) and Tulakhet in Kali Yuga (4th age). Brahmanotpattimartand mentions that the place was known as Brahmapur in Satya Yuga, Tryambakpur in Treta Yuga and Dvapara Yuga and Brahmakhetak in Kali Yuga.

== History ==
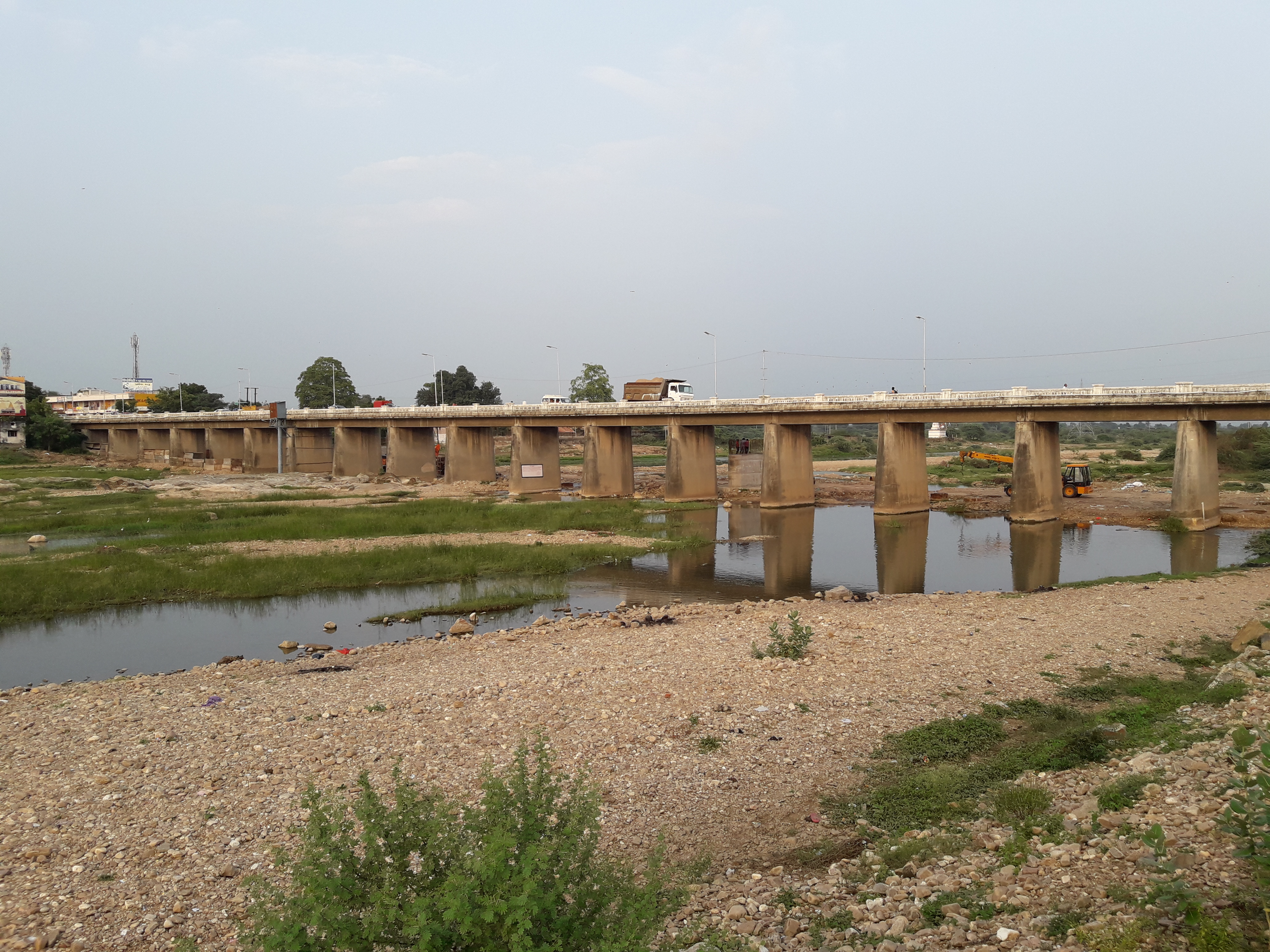
Bridge on Harnav River

Brahmakshetra Mahatmaya (written after 10th century), the jnati-purana of Khedaval Brahmins, is a chief source of the mythological history of the region. It has 18 chapters. It was translated in Gujarati from Sanskrit in 1938. Ganpatishankar Shastri wrote Puratan Brahmakshetra in 1938 which traces mythological and literary history of the region in his book which is chiefly based on Brahmakshetra Mahatmaya. Mythological narratives describes that the place was associated with Brahma and Bhrigu. Bhrigu had done several yajna (sacrifices) here. The temple ruins of Shiva, Shakti and Surya outskirt of the town confirms it antiquity. Brahmanotpattimartand mentions Brahmakhetak town in south of Mount Abu. It also mentions Hiranya river, confluence of two rivers and Brahma temple housing statues of Brahma and his two consorts. Sabhramati Mahatmya of Padmapurana also mentions the town.

The 15" long, 10" wide and 4" thick bricks were used in foundations of old temples and houses. They had crude finger marks which was a practise of Gupta period. So the settlement can be as old as 4th century.

The Pankshindra Mahadev temple was built in early 11th century which has statues of Shiva in one niche dated to this period. The Ambika temple was also built in early 11th century confirmed by the style of its phansana roof. The Brahma Temple was built in late 11th century while the Brahma stepwell was built in the 14th century. The inscription in Aditi stepwell is dated Samvat 1256 (c. 1200) which definitely proves historicity of the town. There are several old Jain temples in the region. Dalpatram has noted that Gadhaiya coins of Gupta period were found during the rebuilding of Nilkanth Mahadev temple near Brahma stepwell in Samvat 1912. Bhrigu Ashram and Kshirajamba temple are also of older origin. In 1930s, more than hundred Jain images buried in ground were exposed by rain which were later moved to Digambar Jain temple on Idar hill. The practice of burial of images were meant to protect them during raids. These images belonged to 12th century.

The region was under Bhil king of Tarsang who was defeated by Parmara of Malwa. Later it was under Chaulukya dynasty of Patan. The region was later ruled by Parihar Rajputs and came under sway of Rao of Idar State in 13th century. Rana Meghaji, who came to power in Samvat 1474, had repaired the Brahma temple.

In past, the fair was held in February which used to draw large number of pilgrims and traders from Gujarat and Rajasthan. The Kathiawar traders used to raise booths on the south bank of the Harnav river and deal in opium, cloth, copperware, jewelry, grocery, and horses. The fair used to last for fifteen days. Goods worth ₹1 lakh (equivalent to ₹16 crore or US$1.7 million in 2026) were sold. The fair lost its importance from the time of Rao Kalyanmal (about 1630), when the Idar State fell a prey to rebellion and disorder. Juvansinhji of Idar restarted the fair in Samvat 1917. In Samvat 1936, Kesharisinhji of Idar got Ambika temple repaired. In Samvat 1947, Gilabchand Manukchand of Vadali took a Sangh (procession) to Ambika temple and built rest house for pilgrims at cost of ₹2,600 (equivalent to ₹1.4 million or US$14,000 in 2026). In 1920, Daulatsinhji of Idar State order to give land surrounding the Ambika temple to the temple authorities. Between Samvat 1978 and 1987, thirteen rest houses for pilgrims were built near the temples by various donors. Himmatsinhji of Idar had built a hanging bridge on the Harnav river. The bridge was replaced by concrete bridge in 1959 and was expanded in 2017 at the cost of ₹34 crore (US$3.6 million).

During the British period, Khedbrahma was under the Idar State which was under the Mahi Kantha Agency until 1933 when it was included in the Sabar Kantha Agency. The Sabar Kantha Agency was merged with the Eastern Kathiawar Agency on 1 September 1943 which was subsequently merged in the Western India States Agency in 1944 followed by the Baroda, Western India and Gujarat States Agency (BWIGSA) in 1947. After the independence of India in 1947, BWIGSA was merged in the Bombay State and Khedbrahma fell under the Sabarkantha district. In 1960, Bombay State was later divided along linguistic lines in Gujarat and Maharashtra. Sabarkantha became part of Gujarat. Khedbrahma is the headquarter of Khedbrahma Taluka (sub-district).

== Geography ==
The confluence of three small rivers (Triveni Sangam); namely Hiranyakshi, Bhimakshi and Kamakshi; is located here. These rivers are also known as Hiranyaganga, Bhimashankari and Kosambi respectively. Harnav river is also referred as Hiranyaksh or Harnai river. After the confluence, the river is known as Harnav which empties into the reservoir of Dharoi dam built on Sabarmati river down stream. Harnav river divides the town in north and south parts.

=== Climate ===
Khedbrahma has a tropical climate. According to Köppen–Geiger climate classification system, this climate is classified as Tropical savanna climate (Aw). The average annual temperature is 26.5 °C. Average precipitation is 843 mm.

Climate data for Khedbrahma (1982-2012)
Month	Jan	Feb	Mar	Apr	May	Jun	Jul	Aug	Sep	Oct	Nov	Dec	Year
Mean daily maximum °C (°F)	26.9 (80.4)	30.4 (86.7)	34.5 (94.1)	38.4 (101.1)	40.4 (104.7)	37.7 (99.9)	32.3 (90.1)	30.9 (87.6)	32.2 (90.0)	34.5 (94.1)	31.9 (89.4)	28.7 (83.7)	33.2 (91.8)
Daily mean °C (°F)	18.8 (65.8)	21.7 (71.1)	26.1 (79.0)	30.4 (86.7)	33.4 (92.1)	32.3 (90.1)	28.7 (83.7)	27.5 (81.5)	27.9 (82.2)	27.4 (81.3)	23.2 (73.8)	20.1 (68.2)	26.5 (79.6)
Mean daily minimum °C (°F)	10.8 (51.4)	13.0 (55.4)	17.8 (64.0)	22.5 (72.5)	26.4 (79.5)	26.9 (80.4)	25.2 (77.4)	24.2 (75.6)	23.6 (74.5)	20.3 (68.5)	14.5 (58.1)	11.5 (52.7)	19.7 (67.5)
Average precipitation mm (inches)	3 (0.1)	0 (0)	1 (0.0)	1 (0.0)	2 (0.1)	73 (2.9)	321 (12.6)	257 (10.1)	165 (6.5)	15 (0.6)	3 (0.1)	2 (0.1)	843 (33.1)
Source: Climate-Data.org (altitude: 207m)

== Demographics ==
According to 2011 Census of India, Khedbrahma municipality had a population of 25,001. Males constitute 52% of the population and females 48%. Khedbrahma has an average literacy rate of 67%, higher than the national average of 59.5%: male literacy is 73%, and female literacy is 56%. In Khedbrahma, 13% of the population is under 6 years of age. In 1991, Khedbrahma had population of 17,114. In 1974, it had population of 8,858.

== Civic administration ==
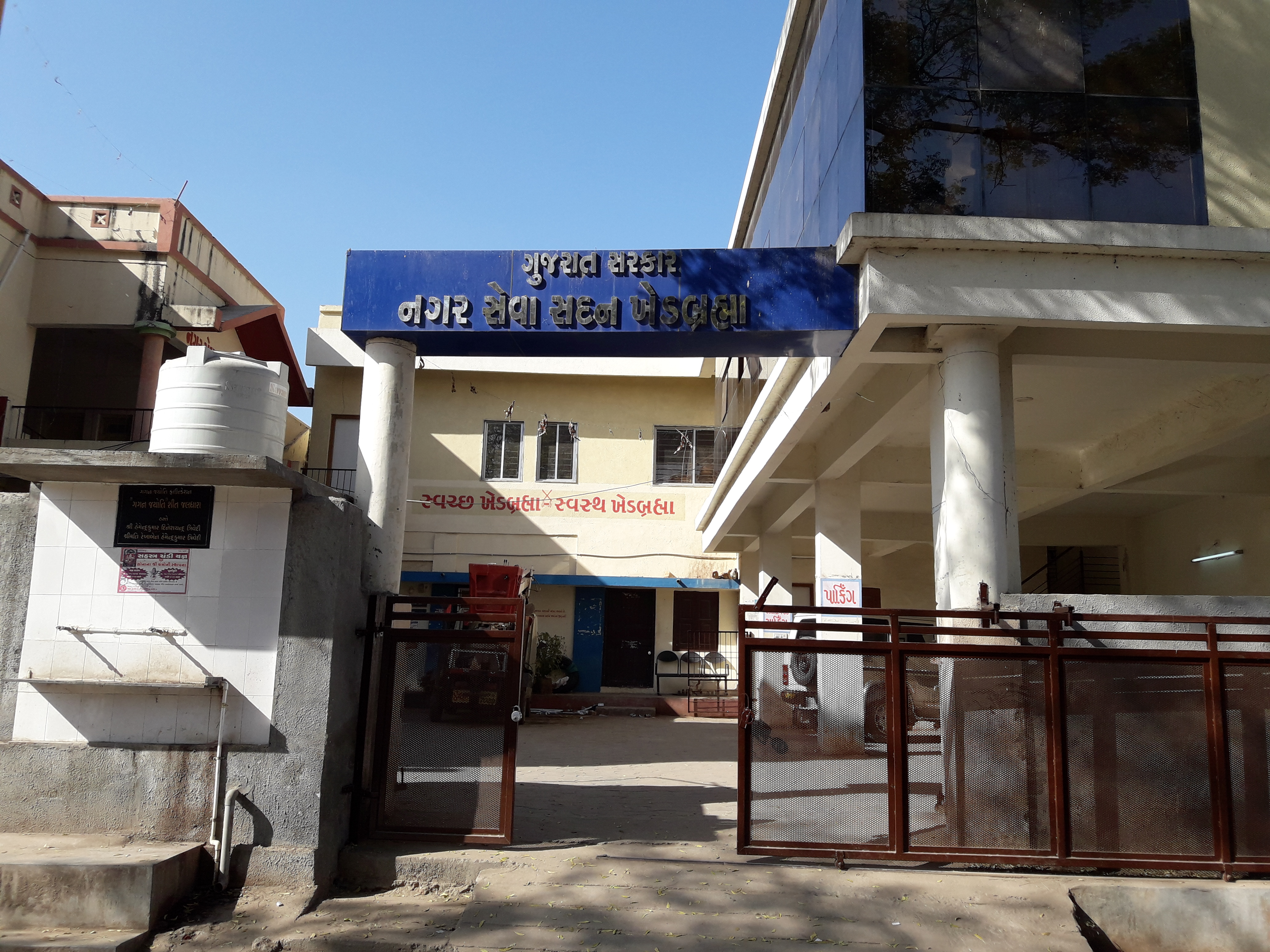
Nagar Seva Sadan, Khedbrahma

Khedbrahma has a Nagar Palika (municipality) and is a Taluka headquarter. The municipality was established on 15 April 1994. There are 9 wards and 36 seats in municipality. There are 15 seats for reserved categories and 12 seats for unreserved categories. Khedbrahma constituency is represented in Gujarat Legislative Assembly by one elected member.

== Places of interest ==
=== Brahma temple ===
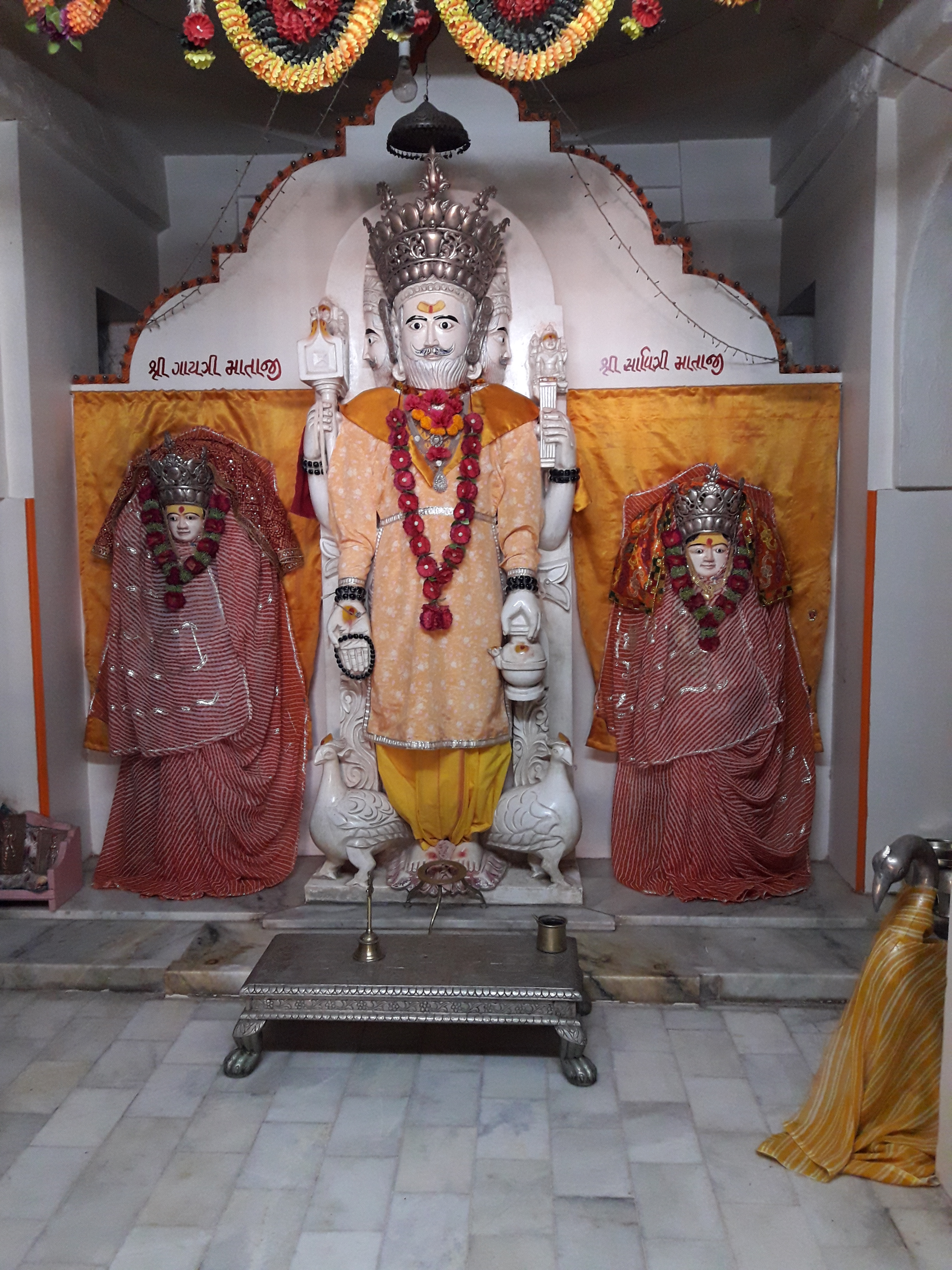
Idol of Brahma in Temple

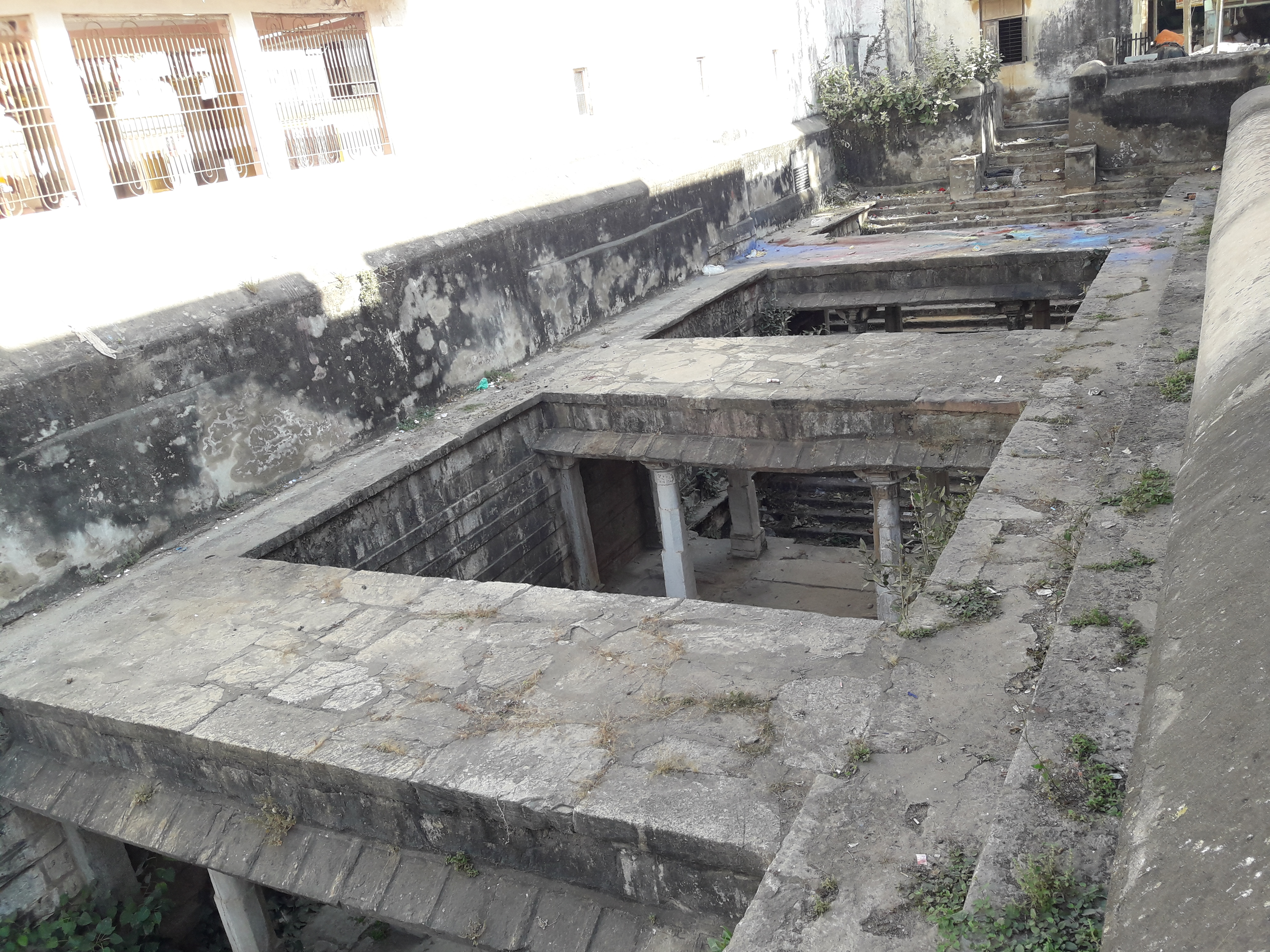
Brahma Vav

Brahma temple was built in third quarter of the 11th century during reign of Chaulukya king Karna, according to historian M. A. Dhaky. The spire, mandapa (dome) and doorway must have been destroyed which are rebuilt later in bricks and mortar. It is built of white sandstone and cement-covered bricks.

The sanctum is navaratha in anga and hastangula in plan and is of fully decorated class. Its pitha (base), the vedibandha and the mandovara (middle part of the wall) is resemble to the temple at Sunak. The lower part of main shrine is intact and is filled with images of gods, goddesses and apsaras. These images in jangha portion are poorly retouched. The chauri-bearers on nandika are elegantly carved which are common in 11th century temples. The phansana roof resembles Vimala Vasahi temple and is crowned with a ghanta. There are images of Brahma in the niches on the three sides.

=== Brahma stepwell ===
There is a stepwell, situated opposite the Brahma temple, known as Brahma Vav. It is constructed in east-west direction; the entrance is in the east and the well is in the west. The stepwell becomes narrower as one goes downwards and to the well. It has four kuta (pavilion-towers) where fourth is attached to the well. It had row of 27 miniature shrines as an ornamentation in the wall of shaft of the stepwell which suggests it was built in 14th century. There is no inscription in the stepwell to ascertain its age.

=== Ambika temple ===
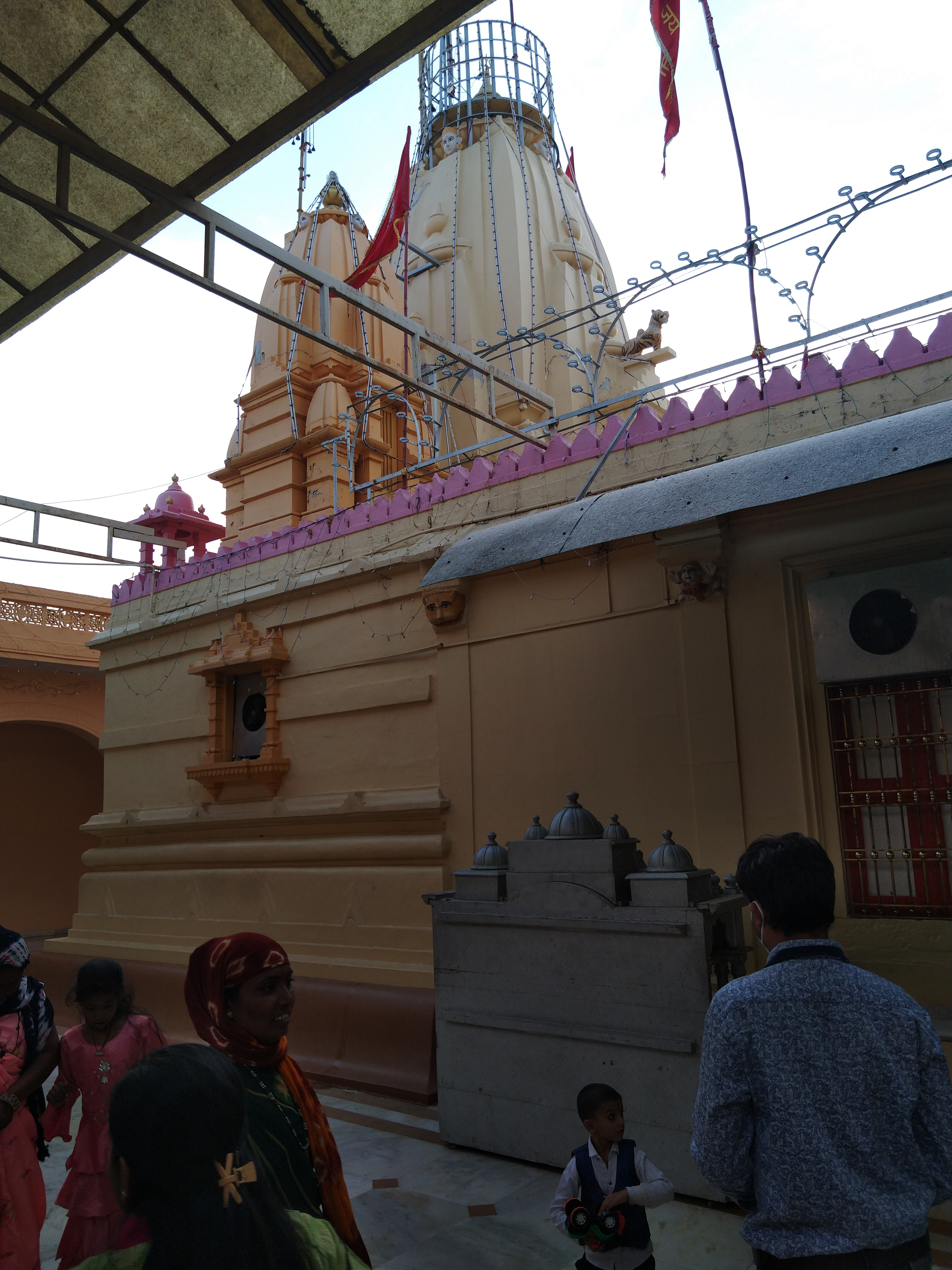
Ambika Temple exterior

Sanctum of Ambika Temple

Situated in north-east of the town, the Ambika temple was originally built in the early 11th century and renovated many time subsequently. It is also known as Nana Ambaji to distinguish it from Arasur Ambaji. The older parts of the modern temple belong to the 17th century. The temple is simple rectangular chamber with mukhamandapa in front. The base has an unusually thick jadyakumbha, a karnika and a plain pattika. It is followed by a vedibandha and a plain mandovara relieved by three niches, now empty. The temple is roofed by phansana topped by three ghanatas in a row, the form only seen in 11th century. The mukhamandapa has usual moulding of mattavarana. The square of temple was known as Chachar Chowk. The temple is north-facing. The older idols in the temple complex include Ganesha idol on the entrance and Hanuman and Kal Bhairava idols. Of Brahmani, Sarasvati, Tripurasundari idols; the first two were originally found during excavation for construction of the main entrance or the rest house.

Every year many pilgrims come to Ambika temple especially during September–October due to Bhadarvi Purnima festival. There are fairs organised on full moon days in Hindu calendar months of Kartika, Chaitra and Bhadrapada. Pushya Purnima (full moon day of February–March) is important because it is considered as a foundation day (Pragatya Divas) of the temple.

=== Bhrigurishi Ashram ===
There is also the Bhrigurishi ashram and a Bhrigunath Mahadev temple which is associated with folklores and Puranic stories. It is located in southeast of the town, on the south bank of the river and near the hillock.

According to the Brahmakshetra Mahatmaya, the temple was built by Bhrigu, Brahma's son who was once sent by the seers, rishi, to find out who was the noblest of the Hindu trinity. Insulting Brahma and Rudra, they got angry and threatened to punish him. Seeking out Vishnu, Bhrigu was bold enough to place his foot on the god's chest. Instead of resenting, the kindly god asked the seer's pardon for the hardness of his breast. Bhrigu returned and praised Vishnu as the noblest of the gods. To wipe out the sin of insulting the gods, Bhrigu came to Brahma Kshetra, bathed in the Hiranyaksh, made his hermitage the seat of a Shiva, and performed such rigid austerities, that Shiva was pleased and freed him from his sin.

=== Kshirjamba Mahalaxmi temple ===
The temple dedicated to Kshirjamba or Kshetramba is located on the hill near the Bhrigurishi Ashram.

According to the Brahmakshetra Mahatmaya or Brahma Purana legend, Kshirja was the family goddess of people created during the yajna of Brahma.

=== Pakshindra Mahadev temple ===
Near the confluence of rivers, on the north bank opposite the Bhrigurishi Ashram, there is an old Pankhanath or Pankheshwar or Pakshindra Mahadev temple dedicated to Shiva. It is west-facing plain simple temple which is restored several times. In the back-niche of mandovara of temple, there is a figure of Nataraja (Shivatandav) with eight hands which helps in deciding the dating of the temple. There is also one more Shiva figure in other form. The temple belongs to c. 11th century, built during reign of Bhima I of Chaulukya dynasty, contemporary of Sun Temple, Modhera. In the sanctum, there is a small protuberance instead of an elaborate lingam which is considered swayambhu (self-existent) by the devotees.

According to the legend mentioned in Brahmakshetra Mahatmaya, the serpent king Pingal Nag had enmity towards the Garuda. He had taken a form of Brahmin to escape from the Garuda and hid in Brahmakshetra. He exposed his true form to his Brahmin wife on occasion of Nag Panchami. The Garuda learned of it and they fought each other. The wing of the Garuda was broken off in the battle and the temple was erected at the place of the battle to commemorate it and named Pankhanath.

=== Other temples ===
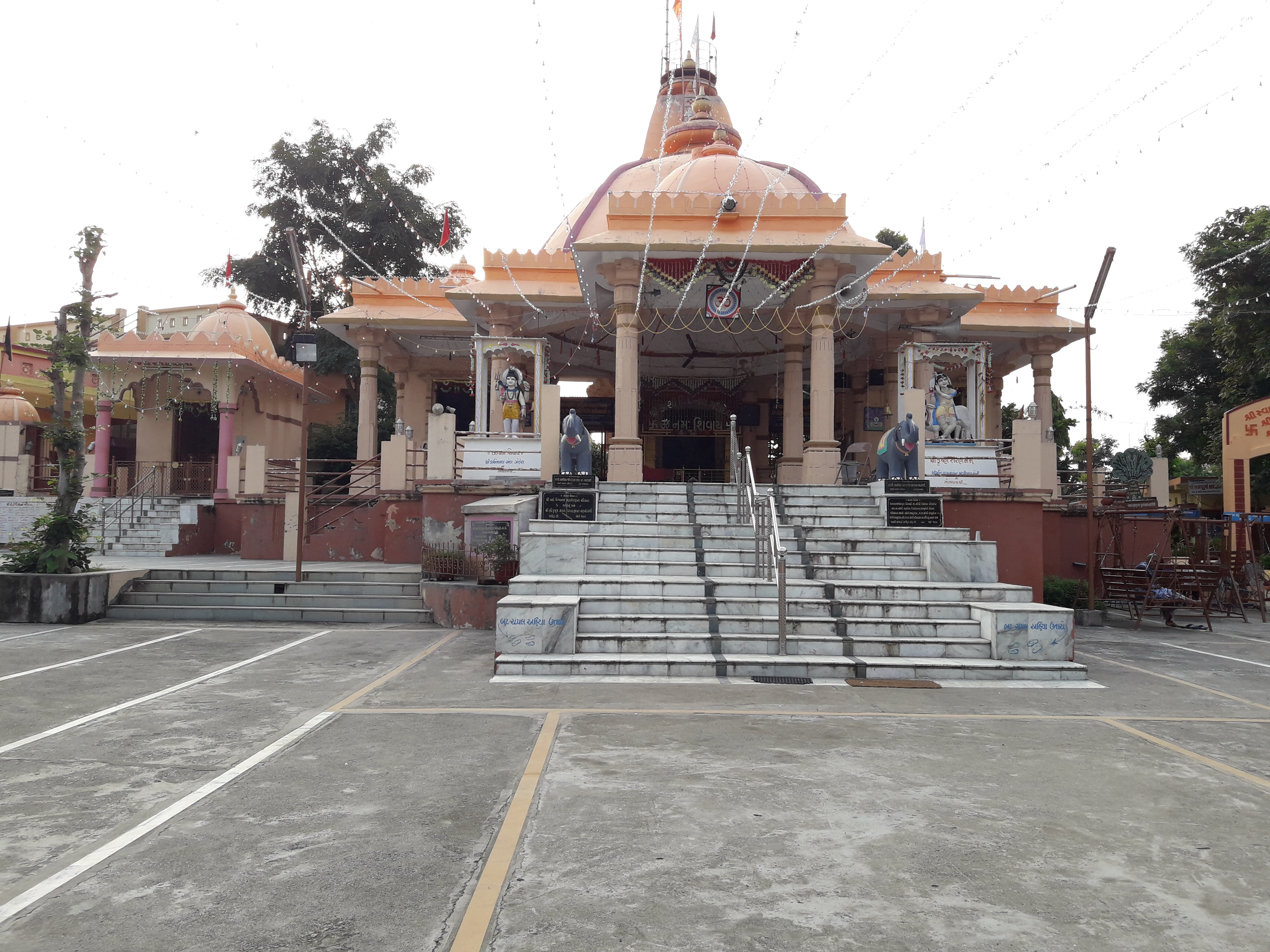
Kashi Vishwanath Mahadev Temple

Hatakeshwar Hanuman temple located in old town is considered old. Near the Brahma stepwell, there is a Nilkanth Mahadev temple. There is an inscription dated Samvat 1912 about renovation of earlier temple. Kashi Vishvanath Mahadev temple is situated on the south bank of the river which are popular locally. Mahavira Jain temple, situated in northern part of town, was almost 500 years old. The central catechu coloured idol of Mahavira is 90 cm in height and in Padmasana position.

== Amenities ==
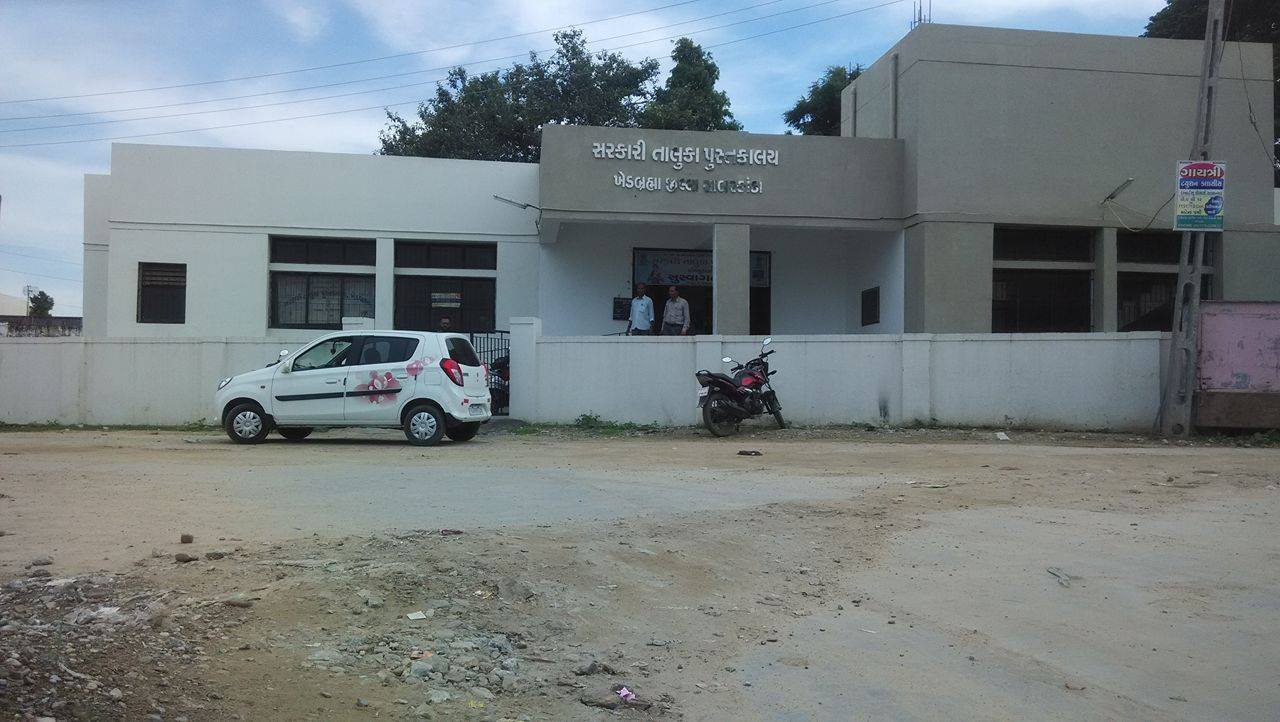
Government Taluka Library

The town has a Government Taluka Library. There were two cinemas in the town one of which was Aradhana. There is a 150-bed government referral hospital equipped with modern medical facilities which was opened in August 2015. The town has all major national bank branches and some cooperative banks.

A public park spread over 3,392 square metres (36,510 sq ft) on the banks of Harnav river was completed in March 2015 at the cost of ₹1.2 crore (US$130,000).

=== Education ===
Khedbrahma has educational institutions teaching from primary level to graduation.

==== Higher education ====
- Arrdekta College of Engineering
- D. D. Thakar Arts and K. J. Patel Commerce College
- Krishi Polytechnic affiliated to Dantiwada Agriculture University
- Industrial Training Institute and Skill Certification Centre

==== Schools ====
- St. John's Secondary and Higher Secondary School
- Ramjibapa KKP Kanya Vidyalaya
- Sant Shri Natthurambapa Jyoti Vidhyalay
- Sheth Keshavji Thakarsinh High School
- Chanchalba Government Primary School
- Asiana English School
- Gravity School

== Economy ==
Khedbrahma has a cooperative ginning factory, sawmills, cement pipe factories and an Agricultural Produce Market Committee (APMC) market.

== Transportation ==
Khedbrahma is connected to all major towns of Sabarkantha district by State Highway No. 9.

There is a bus-station of Gujarat State Road Transport Corporation connecting all major cities of Gujarat. The new bus station was opened on 26 January 2020. It is spread over an area of 29,036 square metres (312,540 sq ft) and built at the cost of ₹450.59 lakh (US$480,000).

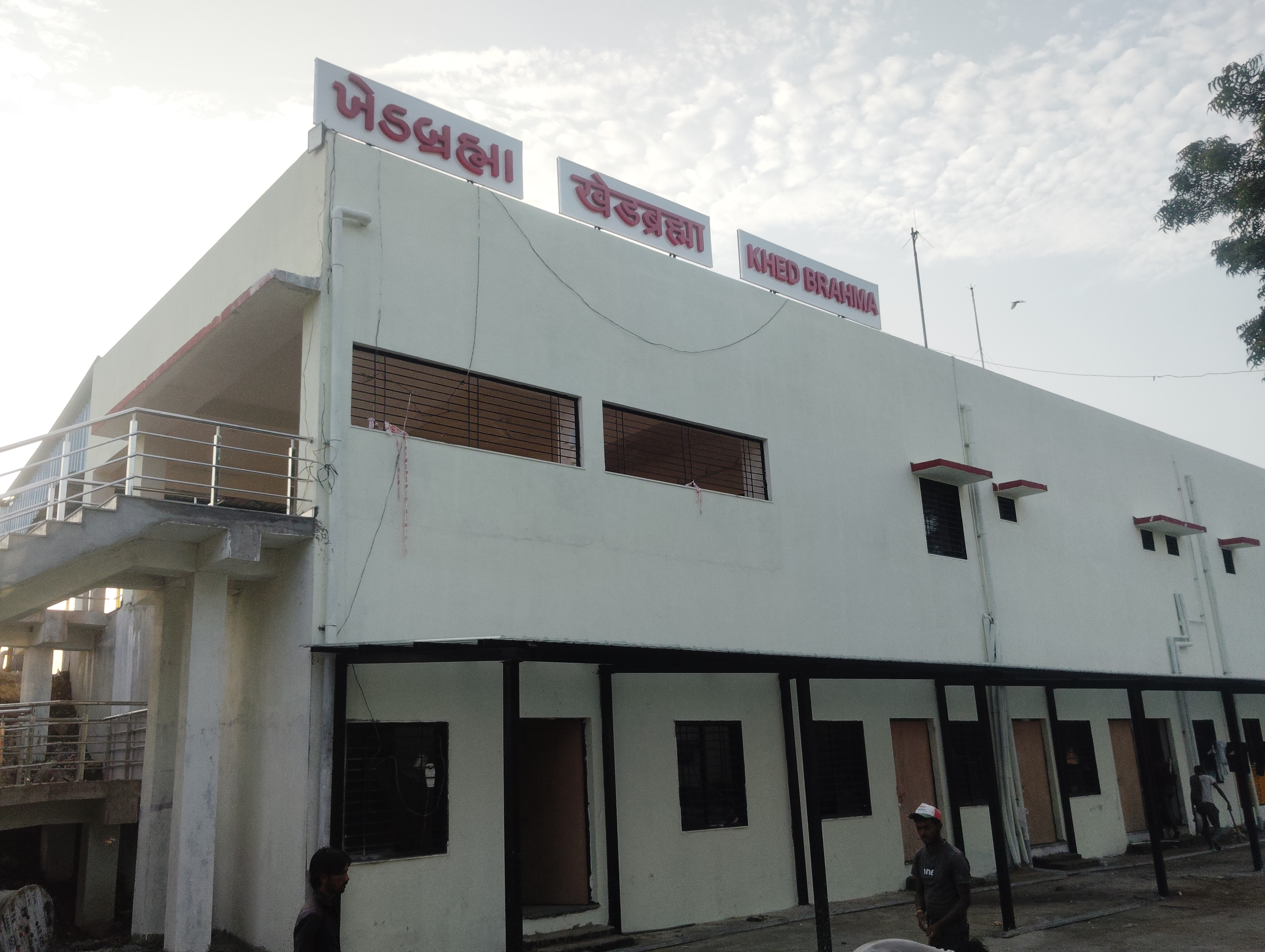
Khedbrahma Railway station

Khedbrahma railway station serves the town. Since 2017, the rail service is suspended for gauge conversion. It was a terminal station of the metre gauge railway line connecting Khedbrahma to Himmatnagar and Ahmedabad. In June 2022, ₹482 crore (US$51 million) were allocated for gauge conversion. The work is ongoing.
