= Sihor =

Sihor Shihor
- town
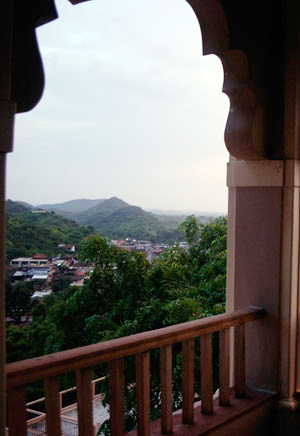
- View of a small portion of old Sihor town from Sukhnath with one of hill ranges in the surrounding
- Nicknames: Saraswatpur, Sinhpur, Chhote Kashi
- Location in Gujarat, India
- Coordinates: 21.7°N 71.97°E
- Country: India
- State: Gujarat
- District: Bhavnagar
- Elevation: 60 m (200 ft)

Population (2011)
  - Total: 54,547

Languages
  - Official: Gujarati, Hindi
- Time zone: UTC+5:30 (IST)
- PIN: 364240
- Vehicle registration: GJ-04

Sihor (Gujarati: સિહોર Sihor) is a town and a municipality in Bhavnagar district in the Indian state of Gujarat. It is placed along the river Gautami, and this erstwhile capital of the Gohil Rajputs, which is surrounded by hills, is situated about 20 km from Bhavnagar. The name 'Sihor' is a corruption of its earlier names, including Saraswatpur, Sinhalpur, Sinhpur, Sinhor, and Shihor.

Regionally, Sihor is famous for its hills, their rock pattern, Gautameshwar Mahadev & Lake, Sihor's Festivals, Navnath Pilgrimage (Navnath Yatra) of Shiva Temples, Brahma Kund, 'Sihori Rajwadi Penda' (Peda or chocolate cake), the old town's ascends and descends, its walled city and fort, narrow lanes, Nana Sahib Peshwa and the 1857 revolt, its food and delicacy, Copper-ware & Brass-ware, Pottery, snuff manufacturing factories, Rolling Mills and Industrial Plants.

Known as 'Saraswatpur' during the Mahabharata period and 'Sinhpur', and 'Sinhalpur' after that, locally in Gujarat, it is often regarded as 'Chhote Kashi' (sub-version or model of Kashi - Varanasi - Banaras). This may be due to the numerous temples and Shivalayas in and around this medium-sized town, its religious activities and the resemblance of the town's architecture in particular. The town exhibits a definite texture and architecture through its numerous ancient temples and buildings.

== Etymology ==
The etymology of Sihor suggests its name evolved over centuries from older Sanskrit forms.

According to Hasmukh Dhirajlal Sankalia, the name Sihor is derived from Siṁhapura, a name attested in inscriptions from the Maitraka and Chaulukya eras. Siṁhapura is believed to be either a reference to the lion (siṁha), which is native to Gujarat, or to an individual named Siṁha. The name reached its present form though several sounds changes: the root siṁha became sīha, and the suffix -pura was shortened to -or.

The name Sihor has also evolved through the intermediate forms of Saraswatpur, Sinhalpur, Sinhpur, Sinhor, and Shihor. Ancient texts (Purana), rishis (sages), and scholars regarded the place as a Pavitra Kshetra (secret territory), reflecting the presence of scholarship, spirituality, and a highly regarded class of society in the area.

=== Mythology, progression and Saraswatpur ===
According to Hinduism, Saraswatpur the name itself may suggest and support the active power and significance of this place, as a place of knowledge, scholarship, and spirituality. Deriving from Saraswati, the name of Saraswatpur should have been bestowed upon it by those responsible. There are references of Saraswatpur in Purana, its references and references of Lord Krishna's visits are found in the Mahabharata and peculiarly in the texts related to Krishna, as he spent the remaining half of his life at Dvārakā / Dwarka.

Another reference is Gautameshwar Temple, known for its Swayambhu Shivling in the cave, a proclaimed secret tunneled trek to Somnath from Gautameshwar, an inscription and the legend of Gautama Maharishi, Ahalya and Lord Rama. According to the legend and ancient inscription, Rishi Gautam's mention of the tranquility, vibrations and holiness of this place, its old name as Saraswatpur, and the detailed account of his stay, experiences and penance, are found. The Gautameshwar Mahadev Temple remains a frequently visited place for its tranquil ambiance, in and around Sihor and in Saurashtra / Gujarat.

=== Transition and quest ===
The names Sinhpur and Sinhalpur are the next in the historical record. The historical period between Saraswatpur and Sinhpur is not well documented, and the amount of historical information available is scattered, specifically for the era between 5000 BC and 3000 BC. Considering the west coast of India and the Kathiawar peninsula, the obvious influence of the Indus Civilization on this region can be mapped through further archaeological explorations and insights. This mapping requires processing existing archaeological and geological data of the Sihor region along with a prime focus on study of the Vallabhi and Maitraka era, including exploration, survey and excavations targeting the submerged city of Vallabhi, which may have been critically responsible for Aryan Colonization across the continent, given the significance of Buddhism and Jainism during that period.

=== Vedic, Buddhist and Maitraka periods ===
Periodic excavations and findings, along with few existing ruins and monuments, already ask for thorough validation of their age. Eventually a large portion of Bhavnagar district falling under tectonically unstable zone, possibility of a major natural calamity in form of earthquake, tsunami or volcanic eruption can not be ruled out too. And therefore, the relics and old Vedic civilization may have been a matter of disappearance especially when the Vallabhi and Maitraka dynasty struggled to exist further, either a natural calamity or attacks by barbarians and/or later the known and frequent attacks by Mongols and Turks have to be the reasons behind the diminishing of a flourishing era of this region.

Sihor is considered to be a prominent Buddhist circuit from about 5th-6th Centuries BC through Maitraka dynasty (till 8th century). Geologists are of opinion that rocks and the pattern of Sihor hills are unique and the age of this region would be older than that of Himalayas mountain range. The hill range is often observed as an outcome of volcanic activity.

While efforts from historians and scholars for validating the research on Vijaya of Sri Lanka and his origin for his voyage to Ceylon in 543BC, the kingdom and dominance of Sinhapur need a greater attention. Its significance and mentions come out evident since early Vedic Period and Gupta Empire through Maitraka dynasty during the peak of Vallabhi with its significance as Sinhapur, it should be the period post 6th century, the name Sinhapur would have transformed into Shihor / Sihor.

=== Lions the identity and, Sinhpur to Sihor ===
However, the presence of Lions in this region (Sihor hills) from olden times to very much till mid of 20th Century and therefore the gradual social transformation of this piece of civilization into Sinhpur or Sinhalpur may be understandable where the lion is called as 'Sinh' or 'Sinha' in a Sanskrit variant. Adding to the aesthetics of Sinhpur, King Sinhavarma is equally regarded for the Saraswatpur became Sinhpur. There is one more research task in asking toward bridging Sinhpur and Sinhalpur as both of these names have existed, either concurrently or at different points of time.

Over the time with varying pronunciations and dialects, it has been found corrupting itself as Sinhor - Shihor and finally Sihor. Interesting to note while Sinhpur becomes Sihor in a few thousand years and lions are returning again to the Sihor hills gradually since last couple of decades and increasing off late, as in the year of 2011.

=== Prince Vijaya, Sinhala, and the Sri Lanka and Buddhism ===
The first king of Sri Lanka, Vijaya the Conqueror, may have been born in ancient Sihor as a prince before being ousted and banished from the region. Other sources however claim he was from Bengal, but after some rectification and cross-verification of all research works covering, Buddhism, Pali/Sanskrit Language, many linguistic-traditional references and connections, Vallabhi, Vijaya's documented route, Geo-political evidences and, documentation and references post Vijaya's settlement in Sri Lanka, all these almost establish that he hailed from Sihor. Period somewhere 600-500BCE through Maitraka dynasty in Vallabhi represents the peak of Buddhism along with Jainism in the region of Sihor and Vallabhi where the rulers were following Vedas and Hinduism but these philosophies co-existed and rather flourished, to the extent, to cross the shores and borders across Indian sub-continent.

This is how, Sihor offers some exciting chapters of its connection with Sri Lanka, Sri Lanka's early history and Sinhala people/culture. Sihor while significantly claiming the credits, as Prince Vijaya (later known as Vijaya of Sri Lanka ) exiled from Sihor settled in Lanka, reaching there via sea-route and became medium for introduction of Aryan/Vedic culture and Buddhism in Lanka. This popular story is often termed as "Lanka Ni Laadi Ne Ghogha No Var" meaning "Bride of Lanka and the Groom from Ghogha" in local culture and literature. A couple of films are made on this subject, one with the same title itself, along with a few songs woven in folklore depicting the story of Prince Vijay and his succeeding march to Lanka. Ghogha, an all-weather port near Sihor-Bhavnagar, from where prince Vijay set off with his army to Lanka, after he was exiled by his father King Sinhavarma / Sinhabahu from Sinhpur. In ancient times, the region of Gujarat was known as Lata or Lala or Laldesa, which suggests to be Gujarat. Mahavamsa and various references mention of this.

Confusion and issues still must be prevailing in settling Vijaya's origin either to North-East or North-West, a significant hindsight is Sinhabahu's who established the Kingdom of Sinhapura in Gujarat west coast, he (Sinhabahu) hailed from Eastern part of Indian subcontinent and thus two different and in fact real historical accounts must create confusion. However, scholars and historians have agreed and reckoned for the evidences to point to Vijaya having come from western coast. Let alone, locally in the present-day Saurashtra and Gujarat region, there has been a long carrying telltale and story for several hundred years now about a local Prince called Vijaya to reach Sri Lanka with an army of 700, marry and settle there.

Two immigration events, one that is Sinhabahu coming and settling in Sinhapura, Kathiawar - Gujarat from the Northeastern coast of India, and his son from Sinhapura, western coast, settling in Sri Lanka, these two different events, the mixed ancestry has influenced the fact of history.

== 1857 revolt and aftermath ==
A critical fact and secret remains intact, that is Nana Sahib's remnants in Sihor. Undocumented material also suggests Nana Sahib would keep changing his location between Sihor and interior Shatrunjaya Hills around Palitana periodically. However, references, mentions and evidences of Nana Sahib's consistent stay in Sihor have been more dominant and documented in regional records and articles at regular intervals since many decades, for he spent his rest of the life in Sihor, initially as a sage. There were some active freedom fighters and volunteers from Sihor during British rule, and one of them, had he been associated with Nana Sahib is often anticipated to have facilitated Nana Sahib's hideout and his group's safe passage to Sihor during early 60s (1860s), while he would leave Nepal and striving to settle out against British aggression in North India and Kanpur which became evident post 1857.

Sihor was a place still quiet, serene, surrounded by hills, with difficult passages and forests stretching up to Girnar range. Religiously to interview the land and region of Kathiawar or the Saurashtra (region), this province often known for its nobility, bravery, sacrifice and spirituality, the place of Sihor in Bhavnagar, Kathiawar, its dormant hills and the jungle surrounding the town may have been a better option for Nana Sahib and his allies to settle out there post 1857 revolt and after leaving Nepal. Also with the fact Sihor and its people had continuing connections with Mumbai and various parts of now Maharashtra, which in turn seemed to have helped Nana Sahib to keep a regular touch with few his allies down in Mumbai and Maharashtra. This may be seen from the correspondence, people who kept coming to meet him in Sihor.

Nana Sahib spent 45-46 years of his life and died in 1909 in Sihor, according to carefully curated historical records. This was not well known until research started emerging peculiarly post 1947 across the region (Sihor) and Saurashtra, with some official efforts the 1970s. Subsequently, revelations of more links, correspondence, his writings, a few empirical archives, documents with the then state of Bhavnagar, few of his rare photographs, some events, altogether mapped a reasonable span of his stay of 45 years in Sihor. Subsequently the reference to Nana Sahib's local as well as national allies & revolutionaries were found, which nearly establishes the most probable account of disappearance of this historical figure. Most critically when all these secrets about the person as well as location were meant rather for keeping them as secret and not for the claims.

Among the locals, a piece of history regarding the remainder: Nana Sahib's life in Sihor, his character, his thoughts and deeds, his subtle nature and identity, his local and general involvement, all these conveyed by those who were close to him directly or indirectly in Sihor, periodically were published in the region. Adding to that, some steps and initiatives taken by him, and the belongings & remnants, these all when acknowledged and realized later, post 1947, eventually to acknowledge they were just Nana Sahib, are all a serious subject of learning and retrospection. This account poses re-evaluation of an incomplete task, a structured approach and serious initiative in asking the state government of Gujarat and the Central Government, India.

Presently, there is a house signified to Nana Sahib in old town of Sihor, remnants and materials, an old tomb as a tribute to him by the locals, a few existing connections/references and recently a recreational park named after Nana Sahib Peshwa in Sihor.

Sihor is a Chunval village, about twelve miles north of Viramgam, where, in 1825, were the well-marked remains of an old city. The line of walls could be clearly traced, bricks much larger than those now in use were found, and many bracelets and other ornaments were often dug up. Like Kangavati and Patan, Sihor is, about 300 years ago, said to have been overwhelmed in a storm of dust and sand from the Rann of Kutch. A ruined temple of a Mata bears the date Samvat 1625 (1569).

== Geography ==
Sihor is located at 21.425277°N 71.573604°E. It has an average elevation of 60 metres (196 feet).

== Demographics ==
As of 2011 India census, Sihor had a population of 26000. Males constitute 13000 of the population and females 13000. Sihor has an average literacy rate of 81.11%, higher than the national average of 74.04%: male literacy is 87.81%, and female literacy is 73.62%. In Sihor, 12.51% of the population is under 6 years of age.

== Transportation ==
=== Air ===
The nearest airport to Sihor is Bhavnagar Airport which has direct flights to Mumbai.

=== Railway ===
Sihor is a railway junction.(SOJN)

Sihor is connected to major parts of Saurashtra, Ahmedabad, Mumbai and rest of India by rail. As a Railway Junction in Bhavnagar Division, Sihor got the first rail access (Meter gauge) in form of Bhavnagar State Railway in year 1880 after the Princely state of Bhavnagar became the first in the province and third (after Baroda and Hyderabad) in the country to construct their own railway line.

There is direct connection from Sihor to Bhavnagar, Rajkot, Junagadh, Jamnagar, Somnath, Okha, Dwarka, Palitana, Botad, Mahuva, Ahmedabad, Surendranagar, Surat, Mumbai, Delhi, Jaipur, Kakinada, Kochuveli and many intermediate stations. The line has been converted into Broad gauge now.

=== Road ===
By Road, Sihor is connected with all major cities of Gujarat with some direct routes connecting Bhavnagar, Ahmedabad, Rajkot, and with another access to Saurashtra's coastal route via Bhavnagar and access to Vadodara, Mumbai and South India via Dholera Highway. These routes extend and connect to distant places and big centers of Saurashtra and Gujarat.

As a popular approach for local and regional transport, people prefer road over rail as the mode of transportation to reach the town quickly. Private public transport is also available frequently to access nearby centers.

== Places of Historical, Archaeological and Religious significance ==
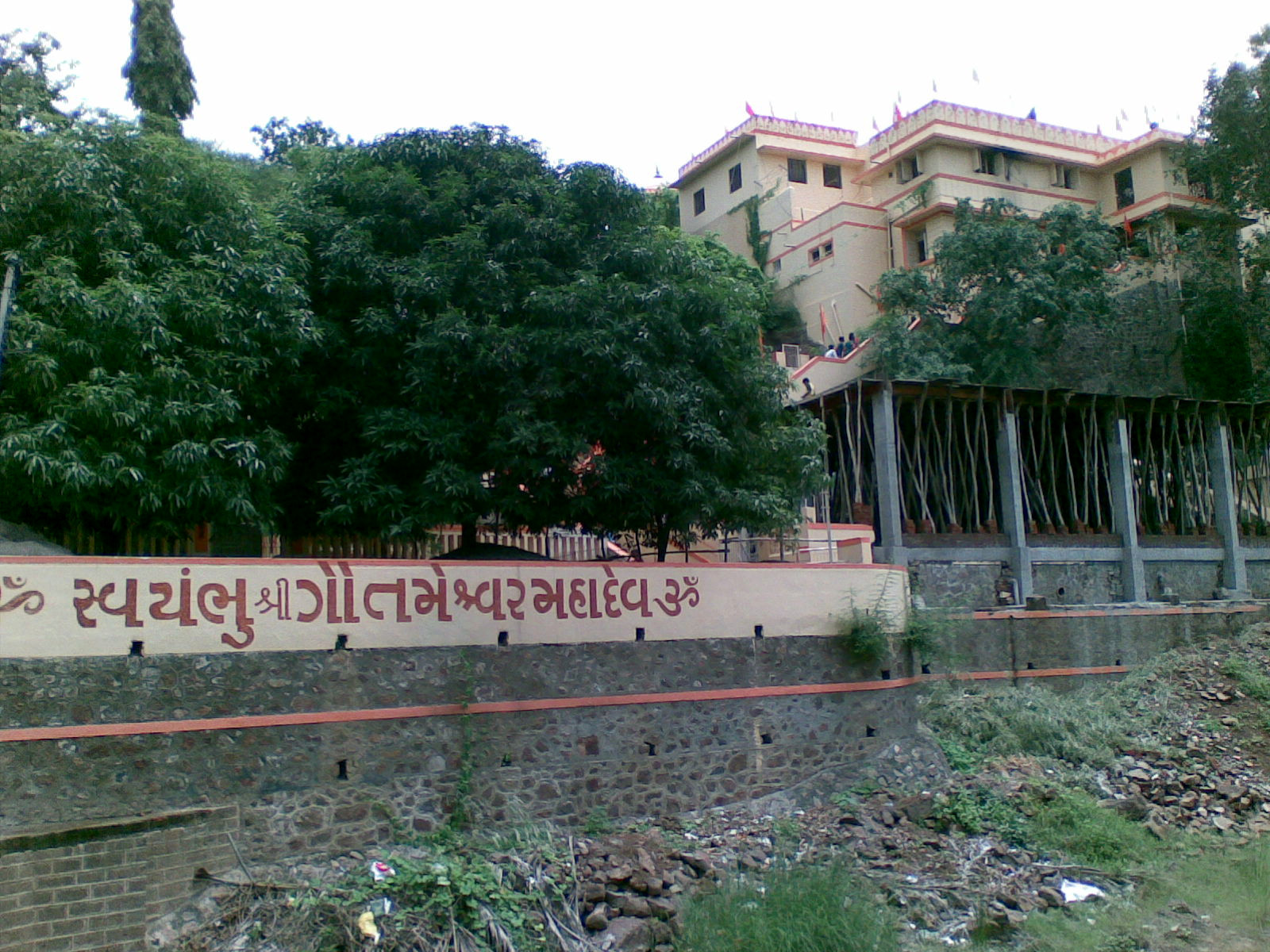
Gautameshwar Mahadev Temple

These different religious places have, in fact, varying and unique aspects to present, not limited to religion or religious rituals. Some places denote major historical events, spiritual significance, archaeological significance, social and cultural landmarks, architecture, community works, philanthropy, astronomical significance, and environmental messages in the background.

Some of these places are famous and significant locally, while a few are significant on a larger scale as well. Many of these places serve as mediums for recreational activities for locals, various social works, educational activities, yoga, workshops and seminars, and civil works.

Major points of attraction in Sihor are the 12th century Brahma Kund (a stepped tank surrounded by idols of Hindu deities) - built by Raja Jayasimha Siddharaja, Gautameshwar Temple and Lake, Sihor's hills and treks, and the 17th century Vijay Vilas Palace of the Maharajahs, with fine paintings and wood carvings. Another archaeological ancient site of Saat Sheri (a mountaintop or a mound) along with some of the nine major Shiva temples spread around the town are an important pilgrimage worth visiting.

Other tourist interests in and around the town include the famous Khodiyar Mata Temple and the Sihori Mata Temple – which offers a panoramic view over Gautameshwar Lake and the whole town. The old fort of Sihor with its wall art is worth a visit.

=== Instant look ===
- Sihori Mata Mandir (Kuldevi(Goddess) of 'Jani', 'Joshi' and 'Audichya' Brahmins and regarded as Nagardevi(Goddess) as well)
- At least 20 prominent Hill ranges surrounding Sihor, locally called as "Dungar" each (entire range which boast of flora, fauna, herbs, minerals and metals.)
- Gautmeshwar Lake, Kund & Mandir (Pre historic, references of Lord Rama, Gautam Rishi, Ahalya and later with stay of Nanasaheb Peshwa (Nana Sahib) nearby this place)
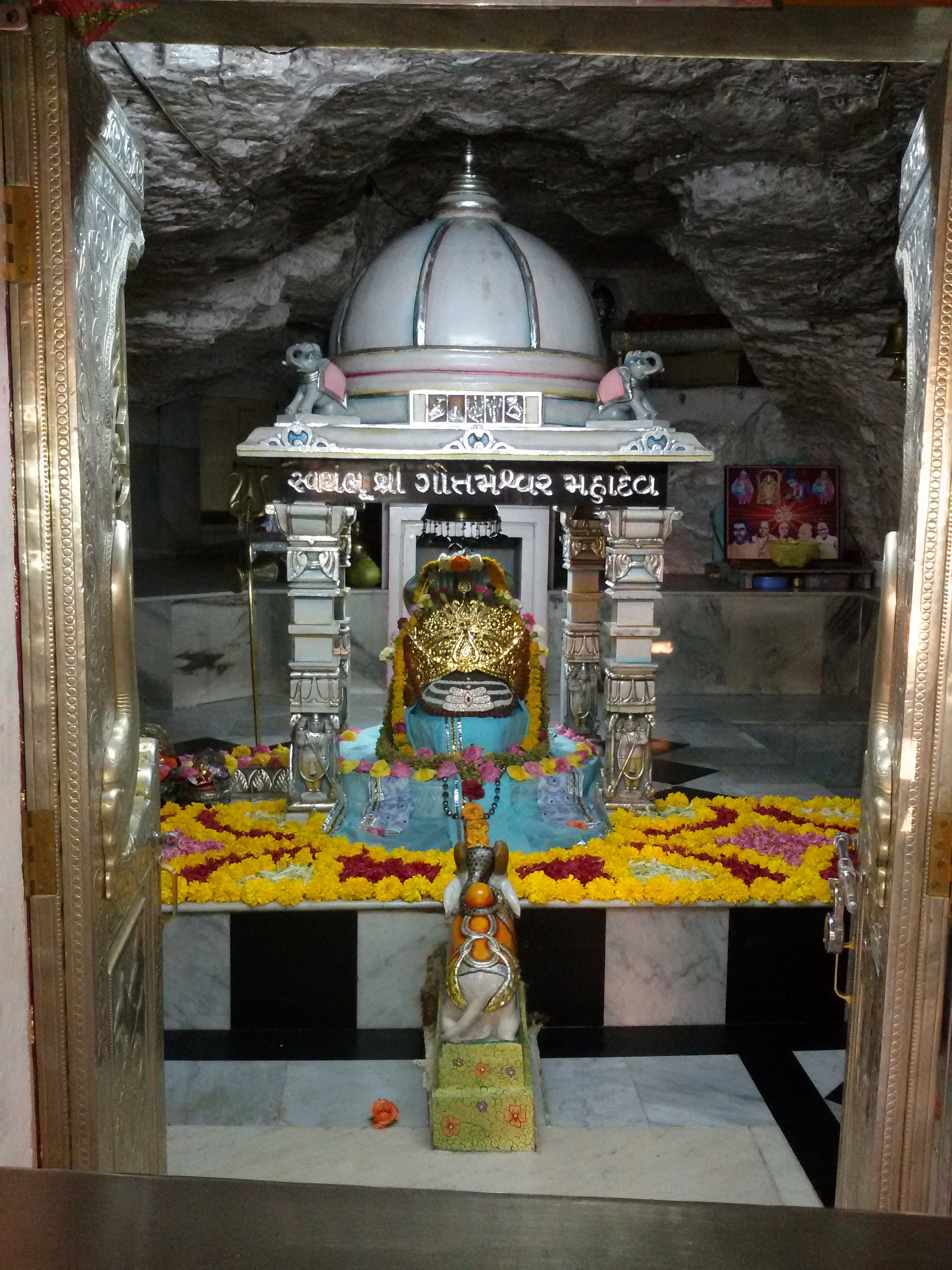
  Gotmeshwar Mahadev
- Cave/Tunnel (Gufa) to Girnar and Somnath (Pre historic and an example of engineering brilliance, now sealed)
- Navnath Mahadevs (Nine main Shivayalas - Shiva Temples, some temples and their surrounding area needing serious conservation)
- Hanuman Dhara (a rare example of community and collective efforts)
- Brahma Kund (a stepped tank surrounded by idols of Hindu deities)
- Monghiba and Koyaram Bapu Ni Jagya
- Panch Pir (Five Dargahs/Mosques of Pir/Fakir/Saints, such as Gareebshah Pir)
- Darbargarh & Paintings
- Sihor Fort, Wall and Darwajas in various directions (ancient, needing serious attention-revival)
- Saat Sheri (Pre-historic monument) A small hill behind Bramhkund. Sihor is basically a village gifted to Bramhins by the rulers. It is believed that in a local war (Dhinganu) many Bramhins were killed. After the war, 'Janoi's of the dead Bramhins were collected and weighted, that was Seven Shers (1 Sher = 500 grams), so say 3.5 kg. In remembrance of that Balidan by Bramhins, a hill was named Saat Sheri and a small monument was built there. Many 'Palia's (sacrifice-stone) can be seen near Bramhkund even today.
- Surka Gate (Surka No Delo) (ancient, needing revival)
- Jodnath Mahadev and Shirdi Sai Nath Baba Temple

=== What more explorable ===
- Some ancient trade/business practices, such as Copper, Brass, Bronze, Steel utensils, pottery, snuff and horticulture, etc.
- Architecture, lanes, temples of old Sihor, houses and town planning
- Archaeological Exploration and insights into almost under-surface pre-historic civilization
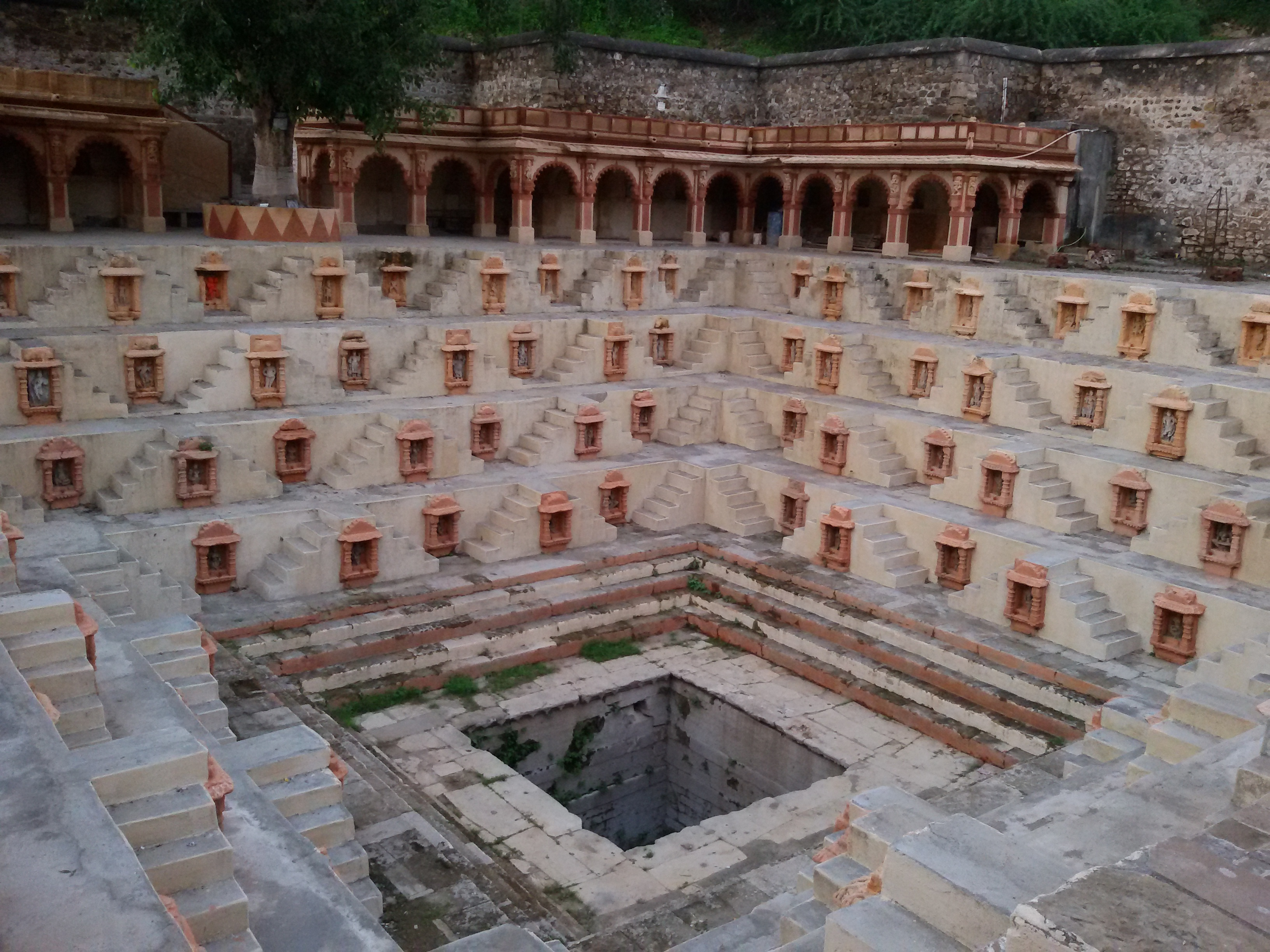
- Brahmakund
  Rocky mountain range/hills of Sihor and their unique rock pattern
- Remnants of Nana Sahib Peshwa, the Indian Rebellion of 1857, its legacy and some rare facts
- Secret Tunneled Trek from Sihor to Girnar - Somnath (pre historic)
- Ancient Gateway, Trek to Shatrunjaya Hills from Old Sihor (Hills), the trek overlapped and covered now, although its idea and view of Shatrunjaya Hills can be had during clear weather
- Iron & Steel Rolling Mills
- Delicious and fresh food/fruits/vegetables, Laddu, Sihori-Rajwadi Penda, Namkins(Farsan) and taste of Sihor
- Sihor's typically easy, simple, leisure, introvert, hard-shelled, slow-medium paced lifestyle
- Festivals, Festivities and 'Mela' of Sihor, especially during the month of Shraavan

=== Navnath Mahadevs and other significant landmarks ===
The Navnath Pilgrimage covers some ancient to very ancient Shiva temples of Sihor. These temples are built and/or renovated between 1000 AD - 1600 AD. This pilgrimage is believed to have more significance when undertaken in the month of Shraavan according to Hindu Calendar. There are faith and devotion attached among people in the region. However, devotees generally don't miss a chance to undertake this brief pilgrimage anytime during the year. Making this pilgrimage by foot is basically preferred and celebrated since old times, and those who are in hurry take up vehicle to cover it.

==== The Standard Navnath itinerary ====
- Rajnath Mahadev (in the old town)
- Ramnath Mahadev (toward hills)
- Sukhnath Mahadev (close to Saat Sheri)
- Bhavnath Mahadev (en route Brahma Kund)
- Kamnath Mahadev (at Brahma Kund)
- Jodnath Mahadev & Shree Shirdi Sai Baba Temple (in the opposite direction of Brahma Kund)
- Bhootnath Mahadev (adjoining crematorium along the Gautami river)
- Dharnath Mahadev (opposite Bhootnath)
- Bhimnath Mahadev (opposite Pragateshwar or Pragatnath Mahadev)

==== Along Navnath Yatra and other significant temples and places ====
The following places and temples fall on the way or off the track in Navnath Yatra. Some are close and a few are distant from the Navnath route. Depending on the capacity and convenience, many devotees still pay a visit to following.

- Brahma Kund (there are two approaches to Brahma Kund, one from Old Sihor road and one from Kansara Bazar)
- Hanuman Dhara and Radha Krishna Temple (not far from Brahma Kund)
- Gautmeshwar Mahadev (very ancient site)
- Vishwanath Mahadev (near Gautam Kund)
- Vishe anath Mahadev (near patel farm Society)
- Amareshwar Mahadev (near Gautameshwar Temple, rebuilt in 1916)
- Mukteshwar Mahadev (opposite Bhootnath, a nice temple complex with garden and recreational facilities)
- Pragatnath Mahadev (close to Bus Depot)
- Monghibha Ni Jagya (off Pragatnath Road)
- Panchmukha Mahadev (while entering the old town, a little before main gate 'Delo')

=== Other places ===
- Thakur Dwara
- Vaishnav Haveli
- Mahalakshmi Temple
- Mahakali Temple
- Dada Vav & Harihar Bapu - Darshan Das Bapu Ashram

Originally a place with historical stepped well, which is now reclaimed and leveled up. There is no 'Vav' now. It had a dedicated section for Yoga and Library with some rare publications and books on Yoga, Meditation, Spirituality, Indian Philosophy, Ayurveda, Psychology, History, etc. This place has been named as 'Dada Vav' after Prince Dadbha Gohil. The 'Dada Ni Vav' remained a unique center of yoga and spiritual activities during the tenure of Swami U. N. Darshandasji, who was a scholar and very knowledgeable Sanyasi. Simultaneously it also served itself as Udasin Sant Kutir to the disciples of one of the Akharas and to Chandravanshi Sadhus till the early 1990s.

- Mukteshwar Mandir

Mukteshwar Mandir is a nice temple complex covering large area with garden, lawns, children play area, recreational facilities. Mukteshwar Mahadev sits just opposite Surka Gate and Bhootnath Mahadev.

- Aanandkunj Ashram - Shri Dharmadas Bapu
- Ramdev Pir Mandir
- Tarshingda Khodiyar Mata Mandir
- Saagwadi (Agriculture & Farms)
- Rokadiya Hanuman Mandir
- A Jumma Masjid close to Jodnath Mahadev Temple campus. The mosque is managed by Tablighi disciple and descendant of caliph Umar Marhum Dawood Vali Mohammed Deraiya

==== Panch Pirs ====
- Gareebshah Pir
- Todashah Pir
- Yaqeenshah Pir
- Gebanshah Pir
- Ghoomadshah Pir

== Notable individuals ==
Sihor hosts few notable rulers and many individuals from different sections of governance, society, industry, religion, art, literature, education, and social reforms. However, the revolutionary Nana Sahib Peshwa made Sihor his home for rest of his life, post 1857 revolt carries greater attention, Prince Vijaya is another distinct figure from Vedic Period or Iron Age who introduced Buddhism to Sri Lanka.
