= Malik Shaban =

15th century vizier of the Gujarat Sultanate

Vizier of the Gujarat Sultanate

Imad-ul-MuIk Malik-us-Sharq (transl. the Lord of the East) Aziz-ul-Mamalik
- In office Unknown–1461
- Appointed by: Muhammad Shah II
- Monarchs: Ahmad Shah II; Mahmud Begada
- Preceded by: Unknown
- Succeeded by: Malik Haji Sultani

Personal details
- Died: Unknown Rauza of Malik Shaban; Rakhyal, Gujarat
- Parent: Malik Tuhfa-i-Sultani (father)

Military service
- Battles/wars: Ahmad Shah II's invasion of Mewar; Battle of Ahmedabad (1459)

Malik Shaban also known as Imad-ul-Mulk and Malik-us-Sharq (fl. 1450s – c. 1460s) was a prominent noble and wazir of the Gujarat Sultanate. He rose to high office under Sultan Ahmad Shah II and later served during the early reign of the young Sultan Mahmud Begada.

He is best remembered for his architectural patronage at Rakhyal, where he constructed a mausoleum (Rauza), the Bagh-i-Shaban garden, the Shaban Lake, as well as a mosque in Ahmedabad. He played the important role in the deposition of the short-reigned Sultan Daud Shah and the accession of Mahmud Begada in 1458. He continued as wazir until his self-retirement around 1461, after which he lived as a religious life. He died soon after and was buried in his Rauza at Rakhyal.

== Biography ==
Malik Shaban was the son of Malik Tuhfa-i-Sultani titled Taj-ul-Mulk, a noble of Ahmed Shah I. Malik Shaban was one of the key nobles in the court of Ahmad Shah II. He received the titles Imad-ul-Mulk and Malik-us-Sharq (transl. the Lord of the East) and elevated to the position of wazir. During the reign of Ahmad Shah, he constructed a garden named Bagh-i-Shaban, a Rauza and a lake named Shaban Lake at Rakhyal village, and a mosque in Ahmedabad.

In 1456, Ahmad Shah II, enraged by the ravaging of Nagaur by Rana Kumba, launched campaign against Mewar. Near Abu, the Devara chief requested help to recover the fort, which Kumbha had seized from him. The Sultan dispatched Malik Shaban Imad-ul-Mulk to take Abu and hand over to its chief. Unfamiliar with mountain warfare, the Gujarati commander became trapped in the defiles near Abu and was heavily defeated by Kumbha's troops. On learning that the force sent against Abu had been defeated, he ordered Malik Shaban to be recalled.

On the death of Sultan Ahmad Shah II in 1458, the wazir and the amirs choose his son Daud Khan as the new sultan. Before his coronation was complete, Daud foolishly conferred the title Imad-ul-Mulk on a household sweeper, replaced many nobles with his favourites, forcefully seized royal articles from the harem, and foolishly reducing grain for pigeons and palace lamps. These acts caused great dissatisfaction. The nobles, led by Malik Shaban Imad-ul-Mulk, decided to depose him and elevate the fourteen-year-old Prince Fateh Khan. After convincing Bibi Mughali's, they brought the prince to the Bhadra Citadel. On 18 June 1458, Fateh Khan ascended the throne as Sultan Mahmud Shah. Mahmud Begada instated him as wazir of the Sultanate. Malik Shaban effectively ruled Gujarat as wazir for the young Sultan Mahmud Shah aged fourteen. Rival nobles falsely accused him of plotting to seize the throne, persuaded the boy king to arrest him, and confined him under heavy guard in the Bhadra Citadel. Loyal officers and the queen-mother exposed the real conspiracy. The conspiracy foiled. The Sultan then personally freed and restored Imad-ul-Mulk. When the rebels advanced on the palace with 30,000 men, Mahmud—supported by Imad-ul-Mulk and a small force with elephants routed them. Most of the conspirators were killed or fled, and Imad-ul-Mulk retained his position.

In 1461, he retired from the position and lived a private life becoming a devoted to religion. Grateful for his services, Mahmud Begada offered him a suitable jagir. Malik Shaban declined the fief and was ultimately granted a life pension. He did not live long after his retirement. He is buried in the mausoleum in Rauza of Malik Shaban. According to Firishta, the Sultan appointed Malik Shaban's son Shahabuddin to his father's post and gave him the title Malik Ashraf. Nizamuddin Ahmad and Hajji-ud-Dabir, however, state that the title Imad-ul-Mulk was conferred on Malik Haji Sultani, who had recently been appointed Ariz-i-Mamalik. Hajji-ud-Dabir further states that Malik Kalu received the title Azd-ul-Mulk and was appointed Ariz-i-Mamalik, the post previously held by Haji Sultani until his promotion to wazir.

== Architectural contribution ==
=== Rauza of Malik Shaban ===
The Rauza of Malik Shaban is located two miles east of Ahmedabad. It was built in on 21 May 1452, on lands granted by the Sultan for his services. Two marble inscriptions flanking the western entrance record a Firman of Sultan Ahmad Shah granting six ploughs of land in perpetuity to Malik Shaban and his descendants. The inscriptions read as follows:

'He who is confident in the help of the Merciful, Qutb-ud-Dunya wa'd-Din, Abul Muzaffar Ahmad Shah, son of Muhammad Shah, son of Ahmad Shah, son of Muhammad Shah, son of Muzaffar Shah, the King. Upon a petition being made in our august kingly court by our faithful servant and special well-wisher, Malik Shaban, entitled by the high royalty Malik-us-Sharq, Imad-ul-Mulk, and Aziz-ul-Mamalik, the son of Malik Tuhfa-i-Sultani, who was entitled by royalty Taj-ul-Mulk, we, in compliance with the request of the said Malik, through the plenitude of our royal bounty and abundance of Imperial favours, endow upon him, his children and descendants, to their remotest generation, six ploughs (juftwar) of land, out of Mauza Rakhyal, a dependency of the circuit of the renowned city of Ahmadabad, in which the said Malik has caused wells to be dug, trees to be planted, and channels to be made—aforesaid being included in the endowment. Consequently it is incumbent upon the officers in charge of the circuit of the renowned city that they leave the said land together with the gardens, the wells and the trees, to the posterity and progeny of the said Malik, and make no change or variation in the grant so that they fall not under the condemnation of the verse— 'And he who changes it after he has heard it, the wrong of this shall be on those who change it'. (Quran, II, 177). On the second day of Jumada I in the year 856 H. (Sunday, 21st May, 1452 A.D.).

=== Bagh-i-Shaban ===
Adjoining the Rauza was the garden known as Bagh-i-Shaban. It was enclosed by a brick wall and contained beautiful buildings, a mosque, a tank with stone steps and a step-well. After resigning his post of wazir, Malik Shaban lived there devoted in religion until his death. Following the decline of the Mughal Empire, the Nazims incorporated the garden into the jagir lands of Rakhyal. No traces of it are left today.

=== Shaban Lake ===
Near the Rauza lies Malik Shaban's tank called Shaban Lake. The lake was excavated at his orders and expense. The octagonal lake at Rakhyal covers about 35 acres. It is now dry, little known, and dilapidated. Most of the stone steps have vanished while the cupolas are in ruins.

=== Malik Shaban Mosque ===
Malik Shaban also built a mosque built in 1452 in Ahmedabad. Located near the main Bhadra gate and the Khas Bazar, it is popularly known as 'Hazurishah's mosque'. The inscription over the central mihrab reads as follows:

"God Almighty says, 'Verily the mosques belong to Allah; worship no one else with Him'. And the Prophet (God's blessing be upon him) says, 'He who builds a mosque for God will have a house built for him by God in Paradise'. The edifice of this mosque was built during the reign of the King of Kings Qutb-ud-dunya wa'd din Abul Muzaffar Ahmad Shah, son of Muhammad Shah, son of Ahmad Shah, son of Muhammad Shah, son of Muzaffar Shah, the King, by the slave who has need of God the helper, namely, Shaban, son of Tuhfah Sultani, who has the title of Imad-ul-Mulk, from a desire to obtain the favour of God and to get his great reward. This was done the 2nd of Jumada I, 856 (21st May 1452)."

== See also ==
- Muhafiz Khan
- Malik Baha-ud-din
- Shah e Alam
- Malik Sarang Sultani
- Khudawand Khan

== Bibliography ==
- Commissariat, M. S. (1938). A History of Gujarat. Vol. I. Ahmadabad: Longmans Green & Co. Ltd.
- Chaube, J. (1975). History of Gujarat Kingdom, 1458-1537. Munshiram Manoharlal Publishers. ISBN 978-0-88386-573-6.
- Somani, Ramavallabha (1976). History of Mewar, from Earliest Times to 1751 A.D. Mateshwari Publications.
