= Malik Baha-ud-din =

Vizier of the Gujarat Sultanate from 1466 to 1481

Vizier of the Gujarat Sultanate

Ikhtiyar-uI-Mulk Imad-uI-MuIk
- In office 1466–1481
- Appointed by: Mahmud Begada
- Preceded by: Unknown
- Succeeded by: Muhafiz Khan

Personal details
- Died: 1481
- Spouse: Bibi Achut Kuki
- Parent: Ala-ud-din (father)

Malik Baha-ud-din (d. 1481), entitled Ikhtiyar-ul-Mulk and Imad-ul-Mulk was a noble of the Gujarat Sultanate serving as the Wazir from 1466 till his death in 1481, under Sultan Mahmud Begada. He was one of the prominent Amir of Gujarat.

== Biography ==
After the accession of Sultan Mahmud Begada, Malik Baha-ud-din received the title of Ikhtiar-ul-Mulk. In 1466, Malik Baha-ud-din was appointed as Wazir with the title Imad-ul-Mulk. In 1480, he stood loyally by the Sultan Mahmud Begada during the conspiracy of Khudawand Khan and took effective measures to prevent its success. He was in charge of ten thousand cavalry and held total eleven mahals viz. Ahmadnagar, Purantej, Chahalah-Barah, Harsur, Morasah, Mahkrej, Piplod (in Panchmahal district), Khatnal Ma'murabad, Birpur and Bhil, totalling 921 villages and forty-five lakh rupees in revenue. During the siege of Champaner, Malik Baha-ud-din was ordered to take position in Sonargarh. He is assumed to have built the suburb of Hajipur, located to the north of Ahmedabad, on the banks of the Sabarmati River. Bibi Achut Kuki's Mosque, erected in 1472, is believed to be founded by him. Bibi Achut Kuki is said to have been the wife of Malik Baha-ud-din. He died in 1481 and was succeeded by Muhafiz Khan as Wazir.

== See also ==
- Muhafiz Khan
- Shah e Alam
- Malik Sarang Sultani
- Khudawand Khan

== Bibliography ==
- Commissariat, M. S. (1938). A History of Gujarat. Vol. I. Ahmadabad: Longmans Green & Co. Ltd.
- Chaube, J. (1975). History of Gujarat Kingdom, 1458-1537. Munshiram Manoharlal Publishers. ISBN 978-0-88386-573-6.
- Bayley, Edward Clive (1970) [1886]. Singh, Nagendra (ed.). The Local Muhammadan Dynasties: Gujarat. The History of India as Told by its Own Historians. New Delhi: S. Chand & Co.
