= Saiyad Usman Mosque =

Mosque in Ahmedabad, Gujarat, India

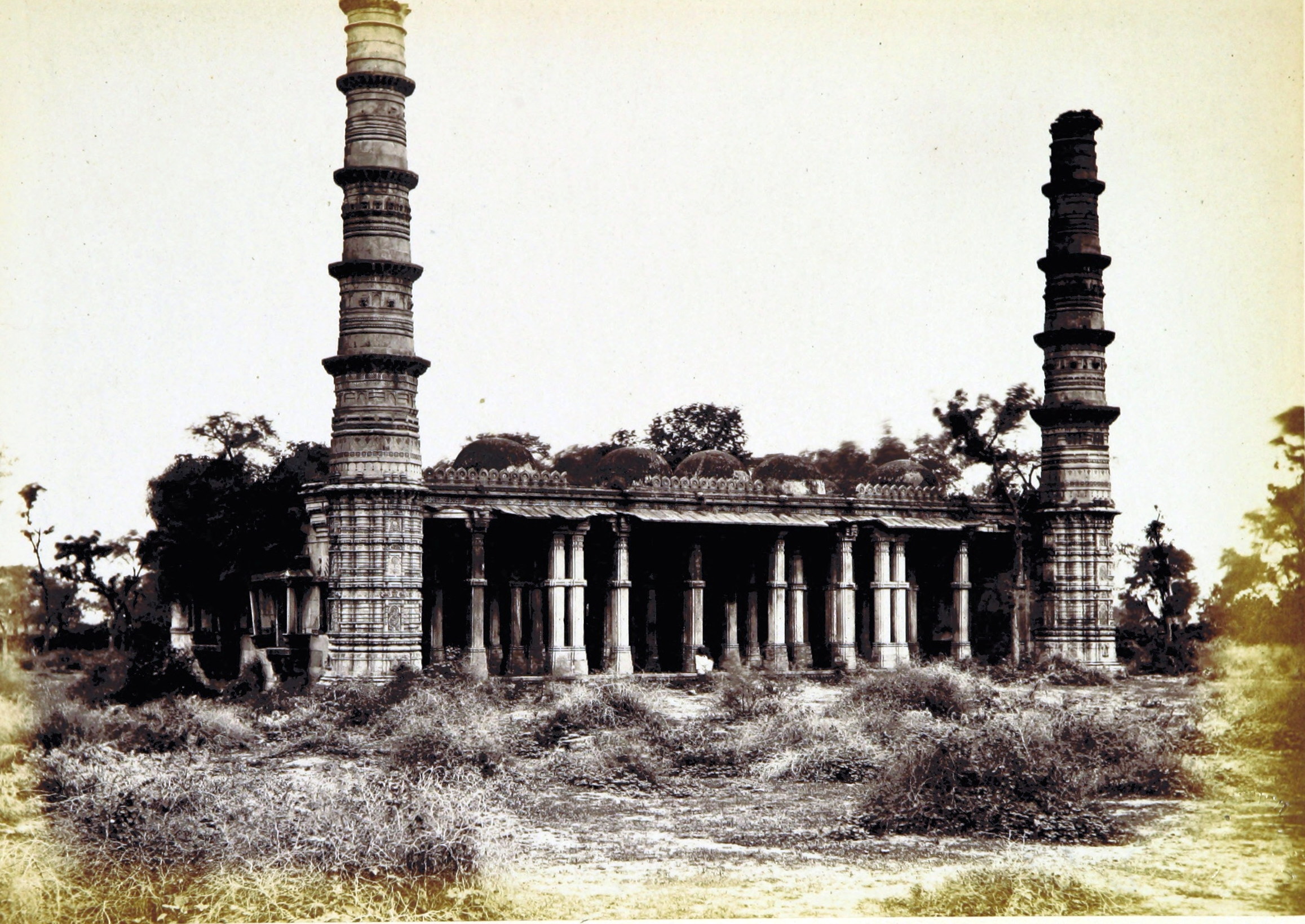
- Saiyad Usman Mosque, 1866

- Location in Ahmedabad

Religion
- Affiliation: Sunni Islam
- Sect: Sufism
- Ecclesiastical or organisational status: Mosque and dargah
- Status: Active

Location
- Location: Ahmedabad, Gujarat
- Country: India
- Coordinates: 23°02′53″N 72°34′10″E

Architecture
- Type: Mosque architecture
- Style: Indo-Islamic
- Funded by: Mahmud Begada
- Completed: 1460

Specifications
- Dome: One
- Minaret: Two

Monument of National Importance
- Official name: Saiyad Usman Mosque and Tomb
- Reference no.: N-GJ-29

The Saiyad Usman Mosque, alternatively spelled as Syed or Saiyyed, also known as the Usmanpura Dargah or Usmanpura Roza or Saiyad Oosman Mausoleum, is a Sufi dargah and mosque in Usmanpura, Ahmedabad, in the state of Gujarat, India. The structure is a Monument of National Importance.

== History ==
Saiyid Usmān, also known as Sham-i-Burhāni, was a disciple and successor of Qutub-ul Ālam, a.k.a. Saiyad Burhān-ud-din. Saiyid Usmān was a prominent Sufi saint, and lived along with his teacher in the village of Vatva outside Ahmedabad. As Saiyid Usmān attracted more followers, he moved out and founded Usmānpurā village. Saiyid Usmān died in 1459 and the mausoleum dedicated to him was built by Sultan Mahmud Begada in 1460. It is architecturally similar to Ganj Baksh tomb at Sarkhej Roza.

During the British Raj, Major Cole spend Rs. 7,500 for the mosque's restoration.

The mosque was heavily damaged in 2001 Gujarat earthquake, and was restored by Archaeological Survey of India in 2009.

== Architecture ==
The mosque, with a minaret at each end, is in the style of the Sarkhej Roza. The mosque is a pure Hindu style without an arch. Inside, the arrangement of pillars, is neither so simple nor so clear as at Sarkhej. One peculiarity of tho tomb is that its dome is supported on twelve instead of on eight pillars. This change gives much variety and the tomb is altogether the most successful sepulchral design carried out in the pillared style at Ahmedabad.

== Gallery ==
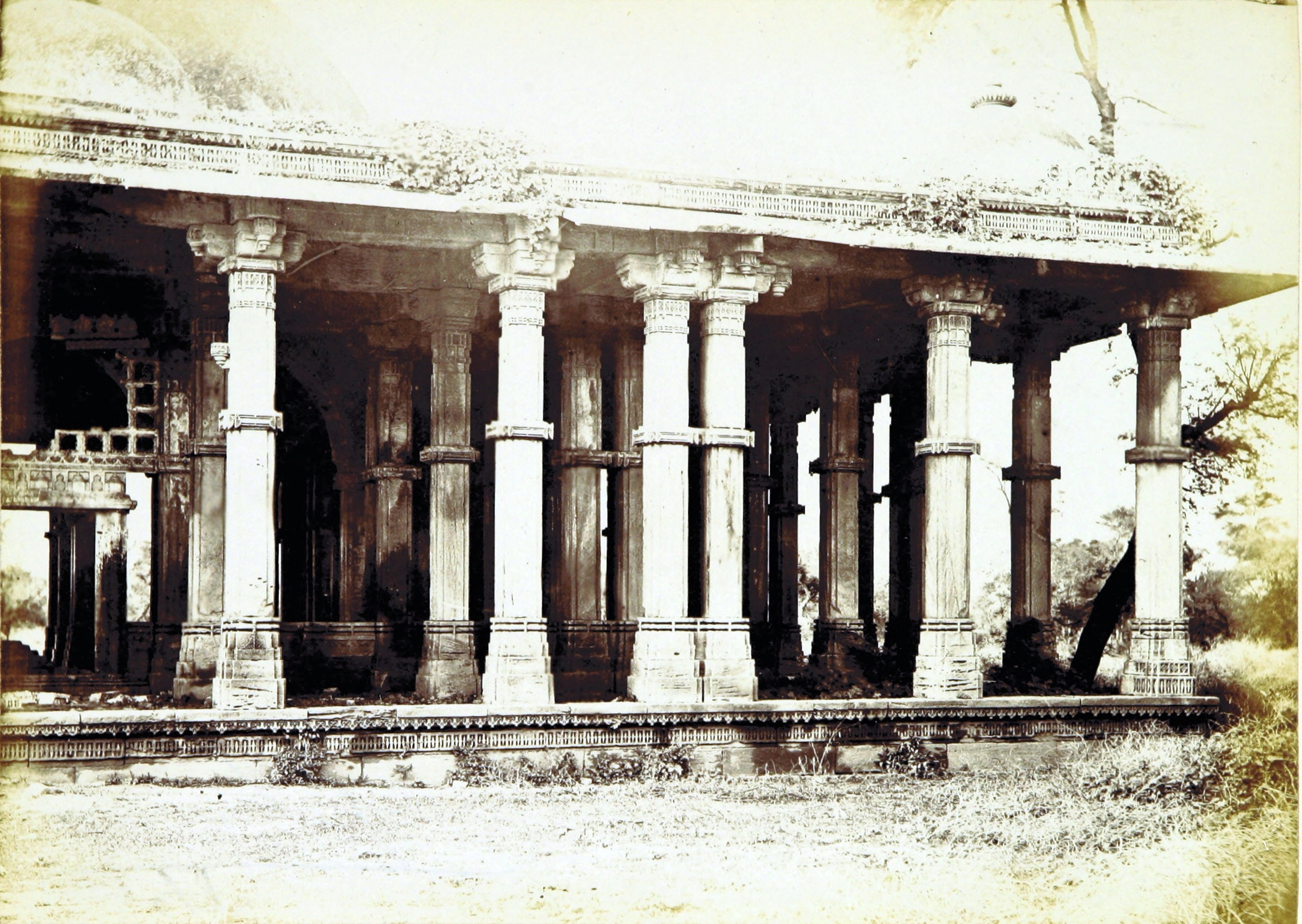
North part of the mosque

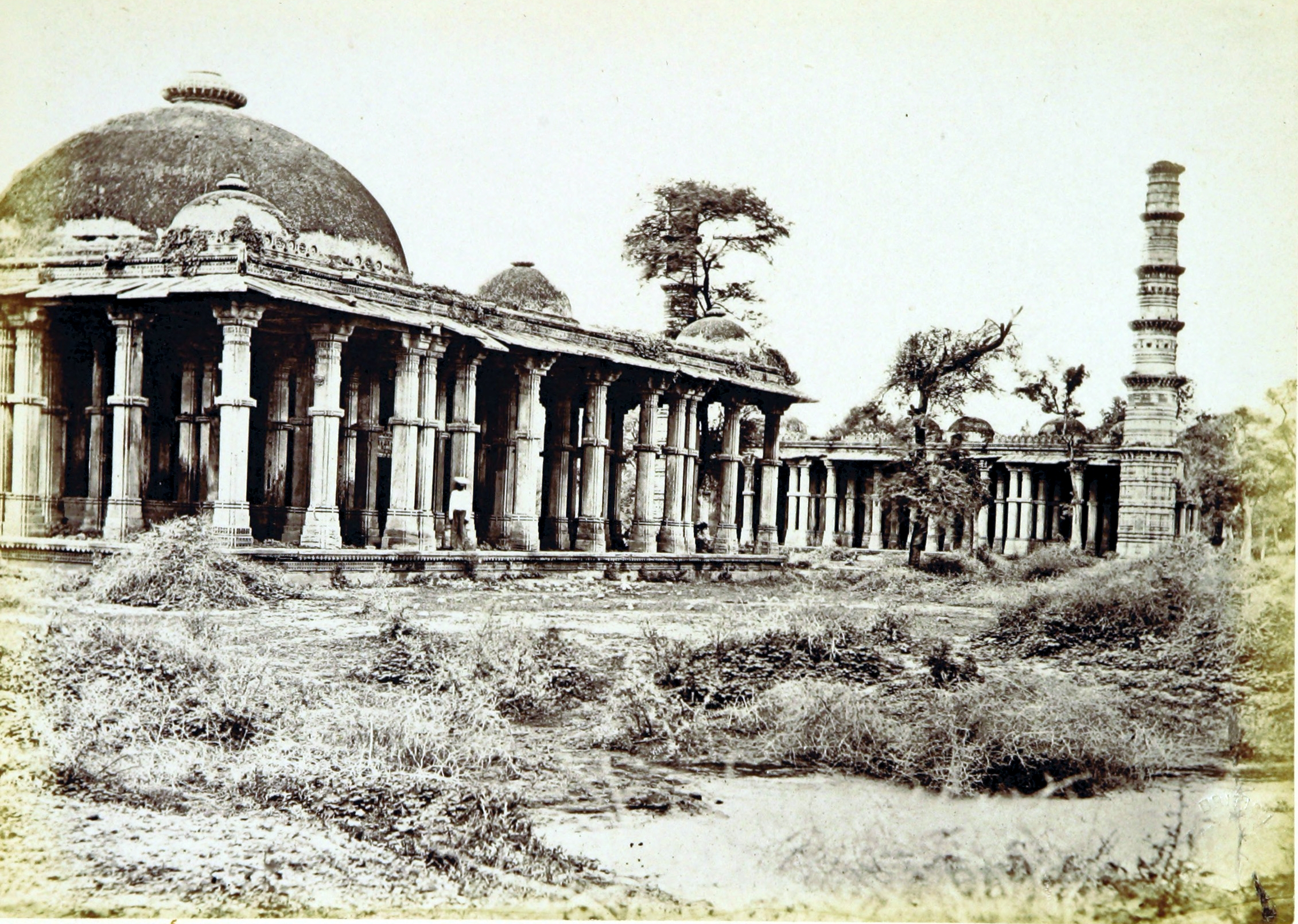
View from Northend

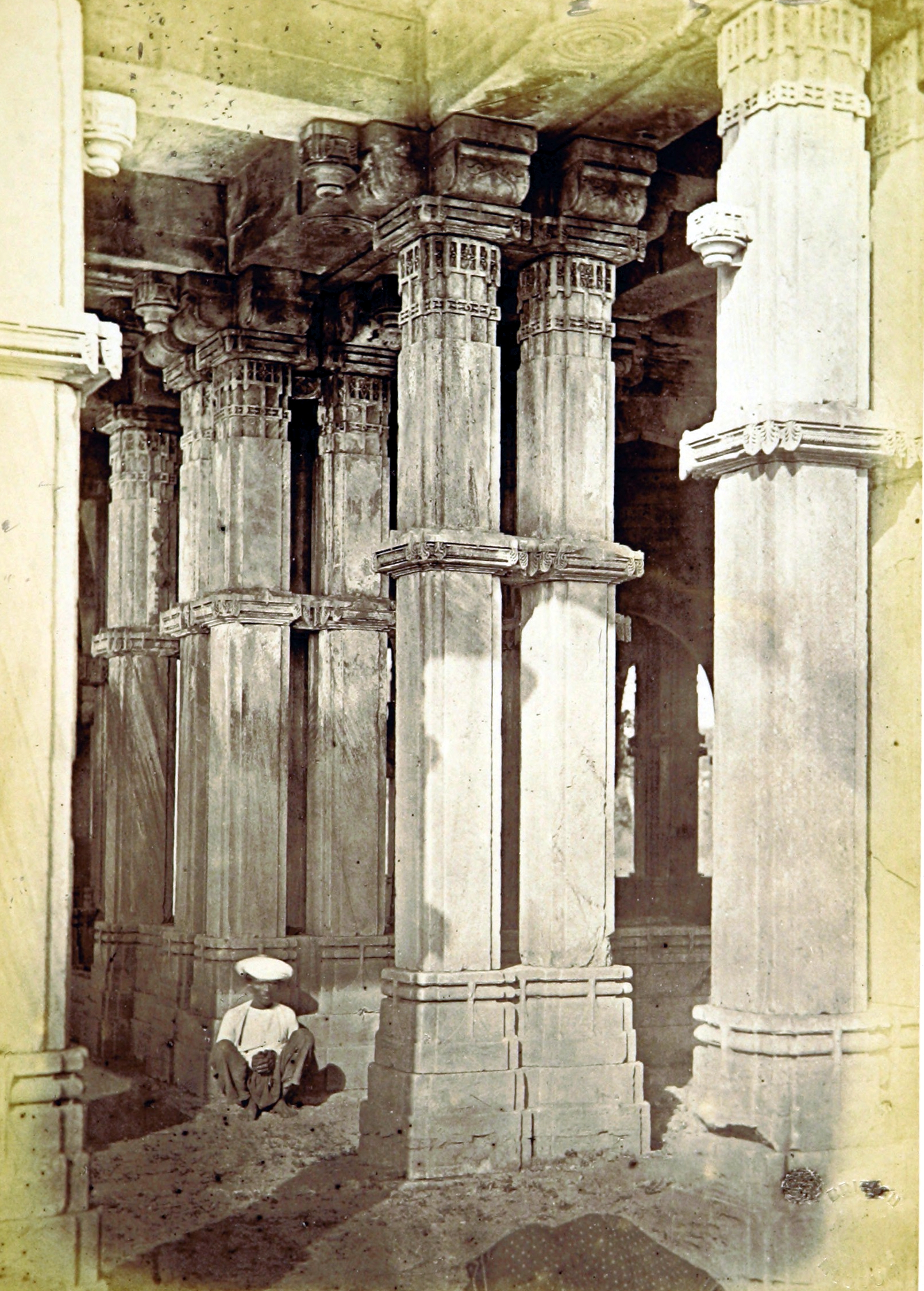
The interior of the mosque

== See also ==
- Islam in India
- List of mosques in India
- List of Monuments of National Importance in Gujarat
