= Usmanpura =

- Suburb
- Location in Ahmedabad, Gujarat, India Usmanpura (Gujarat) Usmanpura (India)
- Coordinates: 23.045°N 72.571°E
- Country: India
- State: Gujarat

Languages
  - Official: Gujarati, Hindi
- Time zone: UTC+5:30 (IST)
- Vehicle registration: GJ
- Website: gujaratindia.com

Usmānpurā is a suburb of Ahmedabad. The village of Usmānpurā was founded by Sufi saint Saiyad Usman, who was a disciple and successor of Qutub-ul Ālam. The suburb is the site of the Gujarat Vidyapith, founded by Mahatma Gandhi.
