= Ahmad Shah II's invasion of Mewar =

Battles between Gujarat and Mewar

Gujarati Invasion of Mewar
| Date | 1456 |
| Location | Mewar (Rajasthan, modern day India) |
| Result | Mewar victory |
| Territorial changes | Sultanate of Gujarat failed to capture Nagaur, Abu and Kumbhalgarh. |

Belligerents
| Kingdom of Mewar | Sultanate of Gujarat |

Commanders and leaders
| Rana Kumbha | Ahmad Shah II; Rai Ram Chadar; Malik Gadday; Immad-ul-Mulk |

Ahmad Shah II's invasion of Mewar was a military conflict between the Kingdom of Mewar and the Gujarat Sultanate. This invasion was an attempt to punish the Rana of Mewar Kumbha for defeating the Gujarati forces at Nagaur earlier. Initially, Gujarat's Sultan Qutub-ud-din Ahmad Shah II besieged Abu and defeated Rao of Sirohi and marched towards Kumbhalgarh. The attack caused by Gujarat was well responded by Mewaris and their Rana who defeated Gujarat's forces at Abu and later defeated the Sultan himself at Kumbhalgarh forcing him to return to Gujarat and to drop the plans to occupy Nagaur.

== Background ==
The invasion of Timur has weakened the grip of the Delhi Sultanate over a large number of its subahs. One of them was Nagaur's ruler Firoz Khan who belonged to the family of Sultans of Gujarat. He was originally the governor of the same province under the Sultans of Delhi. He had, however, thrown off his allegiance to Delhi and become independent.

Firoz Khan died in 1455 which started a succession struggle between his two sons Shams Khan and Mujhaid Khan. Initially, Shams succeeded his father but after a stiff resistance, he faced from his brother forced him to evacuate the throne and flee to Mewar for help which Rana of Mewar Kumbha agreed to give him on the condition that he would destroy the battlements of the fort of Nagaur. Maharana Kumbha invaded Nagaur and installed Shams Khan to the throne. Mujahid Khan fled to Malwa. However, Shams Khan refused to demolish part of his battlements and instead strengthened his fortifications. Enraged, Kumbha marched again. Shams fled to Ahmadabad for help, leaving his army behind. Sultan Ahmad Shah of Gujarat received him, married Shams Khan's daughter, and sent reinforcements under Malik Gadai and Raja Ramchandra. The combined Nagaur-Ahmadabad forces were completely defeated. Maharana Kumbha then captured the fort of Nagaur, demolished its bastions, and took its treasures. Many Muslims were killed and others taken captive. He also seized Nagaur and the nearby territory of Sapadalaksha, but later returned the territory to the Sultan, who agreed to acknowledge Kumbha's overlordship.

== Gujarat invasion of Mewar ==
Humiliated by the defeats of his generals at the hands of Rana Kumbha, Sultan Ahmad Shah thereupon decided to take the field in person. The Maharana advanced to meet him and came to Mount Abu. Sultan too marched as the head of a large host and arrived near Mount Abu. He sent a part of his army to take the fort of Abu under his general Malik Shaban Imad-ul-Mulk and self-marched against the fortress of Kumbhalgarh. Rana Kumbha who was aware of this plan came out of the fort and with a great slaughter, defeated Immad-ul-mulk and forced marched towards Kumbhalgarh. Sultan in the meantime attacked Sirohi who then was paying allegiance to Mewar. Raja of Sirohi came out of his fort and tried to give a battle to the Sultan but he was defeated. However, the Sultan abstained from taking Sirohi and marched to meet Rana Kumbha. He arrived at the foothill of the Kumbhalgarh fort where Immad-ul-mulk too joined him. Rana Kumbha who had reached before the Sultan, sallied out of the fortress and both sides met each other in the vicinity of Kumbhalgarh where the Sultan sustained heavy losses and returned to Gujarat completely defeated.

== Aftermath ==
Sultan of Gujarat Ahmad Shah II who had now been defeated by Kumbha, along with the Sultans of Malwa and Nagaur, decided to make joint efforts against Rana in the treaty of Champaner where it was decided that the southern part of Mewar contiguous to Gujarat was to be attached to Gujarat; and Mewar proper, Ajmer and Ahirwara, to Malwa. Rana on the other side was able to strengthen his position in Rajasthan and Northern Madhya Pradesh by successfully defending and expanding his kingdom on the verge of his neighbouring Sultanates.

== Bibliography ==
- Sarda, Har Bilas (1917). Maharana Kumbha: sovereign, soldier, scholar. University of California Libraries. Ajmer, Scottish Mission Industries co.
- Somani, Ram Vallabh (1976). History of Mewar: from earliest times to 1751 A.D. C.L. Ranka, Jaipur. p. 136.
- Mankekar, D. R. (1976). Mewar Saga: The Sisodias' Role in Indian History. Vikas Publishing House. ISBN 978-0-7069-0416-1.
- Commissariat, M. S. (1938). A History of Gujarat. Vol. I. Ahmadabad: Longmans Green & Co. Ltd.
- Chaube, J. (1975). History of Gujarat Kingdom, 1458-1537. Munshiram Manoharlal Publishers. ISBN 978-0-88386-573-6.
