= Battle of Ahmedabad (1459) =

1459 coup in Gujarat Sultanate

Date	1459
Location	Bhadra Fort, Ahmedabad 23°1′25″N 72°34′52″E
Result	Gujarat Sultanate victory
Territorial changes	Status quo ante bellum

Belligerents
Gujarat Sultanate	Rebel nobles

Commanders and leaders
Mahmud Begada; Malik Shaban; Malik Haji; Malik Kalu; Malik Abdullah	Kabiruddin Sultani; Maulana Khizra; Chand bin Ismail; Khwaja Muhammad

Strength
300 cavalry 600 elephants	30,000

Casualties and losses
Unknown	Unknown
- Location within Gujarat Battle of Ahmedabad (India)

The Battle of Ahmedabad was a decisive conflict fought in 1459 at Bhadra Fort in Ahmedabad, Gujarat, shortly after the accession of the fourteen-year-old Sultan Mahmud Begada. A group of powerful nobles led by Azd-ul-Mulk, Burhan-ul-Mulk and Hisam-ul-Mulk attempted to overthrow the young Sultan and place his uncle, Prince Habib Khan on the throne. Despite being heavily outnumbered, Mahmud Shah, supported by his vizier Imad-ul-Mulk and loyal officers including Haji Malik, Malik Kalu and Malik Abdullah. The royal army led a small force of three hundred cavalry and six hundred elephants against the rebels numbering thirty thousand. The royal troops defeated the rebels who tried to capture the fort in order to install Habib Khan. The conspiracy failed. Most of the rebel leaders were executed, captured or forced into exile. Mahmud Begada was able to hold his authority over the Sultanate.

== Background ==
After Sultan Qutbuddin Ahmad Shah’s death, his uncle Daud Khan was unanimously chosen as the new Sultan by the wazir Malik Shaban titled Imad-ul-Mulk and leading nobles. He granted replaced the nobles who had supported him with his own favourites. Imad-ul-Mulk was replaced with a household sweeper. Daud Shah seized valuable cloths and ornaments from his nobles and ladies of the harem for his personal treasury. He further cancelled large quantities of grain for pigeon and lamps in the palace. These actions caused widespread resentment. Daud Khan soon proved unfit for the throne, prompting the nobles to depose him. Imad-ul-Mulk and the other nobles decided to install Prince Fateh Khan. They assured Bibi Mughali for the Prince's safety and brought him to the palace amid public acclaim and a grand procession. On 18 June 1459, Fateh Khan ascended the throne as Mahmud Shah.

Mahmud was only about fourteen at his accession and showed more interest in games than in state affairs. Imad-ul-Mulk had great power therefore governed in his name. This aroused the jealousy of Kabiruddin Sultani titled Azd-ul-Mulk, Maulana Khizra titled Safi-ul-Mulk, Chand-bin-Ismail titled Burhan-ul-Mulk and Khwaja Muhammad titled Hisam-ul-Mulk who had expected high posts at the coronation but received only inferior ones far from the capital. They conspired first to remove Imad-ul-Mulk from the vizierate and then to depose the young Sultan in favour of a candidate of their own. They told Mahmud Begada that Imad-ul-Mulk planned to dethrone him and install his own son Shahabuddin as puppet ruler while acting as regent. The inexperienced boy-king was tricked into authorising the arrest of his faithful minister. When the unsuspecting Imad-ul-Mulk arrived at the palace, the conspirators arrested him in Bhadra citadel. 500 troops were posted to guard him. Imad-ul-Mulk’s imprisonment endangered his supporters and the young Sultan remained convinced of his guilt. Malik Abdullah, chief of the elephant stables, warned Mahmud that the conspiring nobles planned to revolt and place his uncle Habib Khan on the throne. Abdullah then informed Bibi Mughali about the conspiracy. Mahmud Begada consulted his experienced mother Bibi Mughali who confirmed Abdullah’s account on oath. Mahmud summoned loyal nobles Malik Haji, Malik Bahauddin and Malik Kalu to free Imad-ul-Mulk before dawn and crush the plotters. He ordered Abdullah to prepare the elephants and station them in the square of the Bhadra citadel. He sent Sharf-ul-Mulk to retrieve Imad-ul-Mulk’s surrender. When the guards refused, the Sultan himself proceeded to the place of confinement. The guards handed over Imad-ul-Mulk and thought he would be punished by the Sultan. The Sultan restored Imad-ul-Mulk to office. Seeing the conspiracy failed, the conspirators’ supporters fled in panic. The rest submitted to the Sultan.

== Battle ==
The news of Imad-ul-Mulk’s release greatly alarmed the conspirators, who now feared severe punishment from the Sultan. They gathered about 30,000 troops to seize the throne forcefully. They advanced on the palace with the aim of placing Habib Khan on the throne. Mahmud Shah’s position was in critical situation. He had only three hundred men. Many of them were non-combatants, and it was not possible to quickly summon troops stationed elsewhere. Some nobles adviced him to lock the gates and hold his position until reinforcement arrives. While others proposed to cross Sabarmati River and fight the invaders in pitch battle. The Sultan slipping a quiver onto his back and taking a bow in his hand ordered the citadel gate opened and rode out at the head of his 300 cavalry. 600 elephants under Abdullah stood ready in the Bhadra citadel. It was decided that the elephants would occupy all the strategic approaches to the palace. Though heavily outnumbered, Mahmud Shah and his loyal followers advanced through the Teen Darwaza along the main street. The rebels numbering 30,000 advanced through the main street to make a head-on collision. As soon as the enemy force came into view, Imad-ul-Mulk, Haji Malik and Malik Kalu drove the elephants forward at great speed. The massive charge halted the insurgents’ advance, broke their formation and threw their ranks into complete confusion. Unable to deploy properly the disorganized panic-stricken rebels fled in all directions. Many were killed in chase by the royal troops.

== Aftermath ==
Within a short time the rebellion collapsed and the battle ended. The rebel soldiers fled in disorder, and the chief conspirators sought safety. Hisam-ul-Mulk took refuge with his brother Ruknuddin at Patan and later fled to Malwa. Azd-ul-Mulk hid in the Sabarmati ravines but was recognised by a Rajput, who cut off his head and presented it to Mahmud Begada. The Sultan ordered it displayed at the gate of Ahmedabad. Burhan-ul-Mulk was captured at Sarkhej and trampled to death on the Sultan’s orders. Maulana Khizr, an old fried of Imad-ul-Mulk was deported to Diu but was later recalled by Imad-ul-Mulk and granted a fief. Thus most of the conspirators met a tragic end, and the survivors dared not rise against the Sultan again.

== See also ==
- Siege of Barur
- Battle of Kapadvanj
- Battle of Variav
- Siege of Champaner

== Bibliography ==
- Commissariat, M. S. (1938). A History of Gujarat. Vol. I. Ahmadabad: Longmans Green & Co. Ltd.
- Chaube, J. (1975). History of Gujarat Kingdom, 1458-1537. Munshiram Manoharlal Publishers. ISBN 978-0-88386-573-6.
- Dosabhai, Edalji (1986) [1894]. A History of Gujarat (PDF). Kessinger Publishing. ISBN 978-1-4367-3303-8.
