= Shah-e-Alam's Roza =

Mosque and tomb complex in Gujarat, India

Shah e Alam's Tomb and Mosque
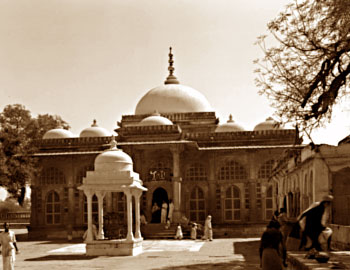
- The tomb in c. 1860s

- Location of the tomb and mosque in Ahmedabad

Religion
- Affiliation: Islam
- Ecclesiastical or organisational status: Dargah and mosque
- Status: Active

Location
- Location: Shah Alam, Ahmedabad, Gujarat
- Country: India
- Coordinates: 22°59′40″N 72°35′22″E

Architecture
- Type: Mosque architecture
- Style: Islamic architecture
- Funded by: Taj Khan Nariali; Muhammad Salah Badakhshi
- Groundbreaking: 1475
- Completed: 1575 (dargah); 1620 (mosque)

Specifications
- Dome: c. 50 (maybe more)
- Minaret: Two

Monument of National Importance
- Official name: Shah-e-Alam's Roza
- Reference no.: N-GJ-30

The Shah-e-Alam's Tomb and Mosque, also known as Rasulabad Dargah or Shah Alam no Rozo, is a dargah and mosque complex (roza), located in the Shah Alam area of Ahmedabad, in the state of Gujarat, India.

== History ==
Shah e Alam was the son of Syed Burhanuddin Qutub-ul-Alam and the great-grandson of Syed Makhdoom Jahaniyan Jahangasht. Attracted to the court of Ahmed Shah I, his father settled at Vatva and died there in 1452. Shah e Alam succeeded his father and, till his death in 1475, was a guide during Mahmud Begada's youth, and afterwards one of the most revered of Muslim religious teachers of Ahmedabad.

In 1670, Aurangzeb assigned several villages to the Roza and its custodians, the Saiyads of Vatva. In 1724, Trimbak Rao Dabhade Gaekwad also assigned several villages. In 1867, the British government in Bombay paid for repairs and upkeep of the roza.

== Roza ==
A group of buildings—including a tomb, a mosque, and an assembly hall—enclosed by a lofty bastioned wall, was erected in memory of Shah e Alam.

From the north the enclosure is entered through two handsome stone gateways. Within the second gate, on the left, is an assembly hall built by Sultan Muzaffar Shah III. (1561–1572), and partly destroyed by the British in 1779 to furnish materials for the siege of the city during the First Anglo-Maratha War. On the right are some other buildings of which the date has not been traced. In front of these buildings is a reservoir. To its left, in the centre of the enclosure, stands Shah e Alam's tomb. This, the oldest of the buildings, is said to have been constructed soon after the saint's death in 880 AH (1475/1476 CE) and completed in 888 AH (1483/1484 CE) by Taj Khan Nariali, a nobleman of Mahmud Begada's court.

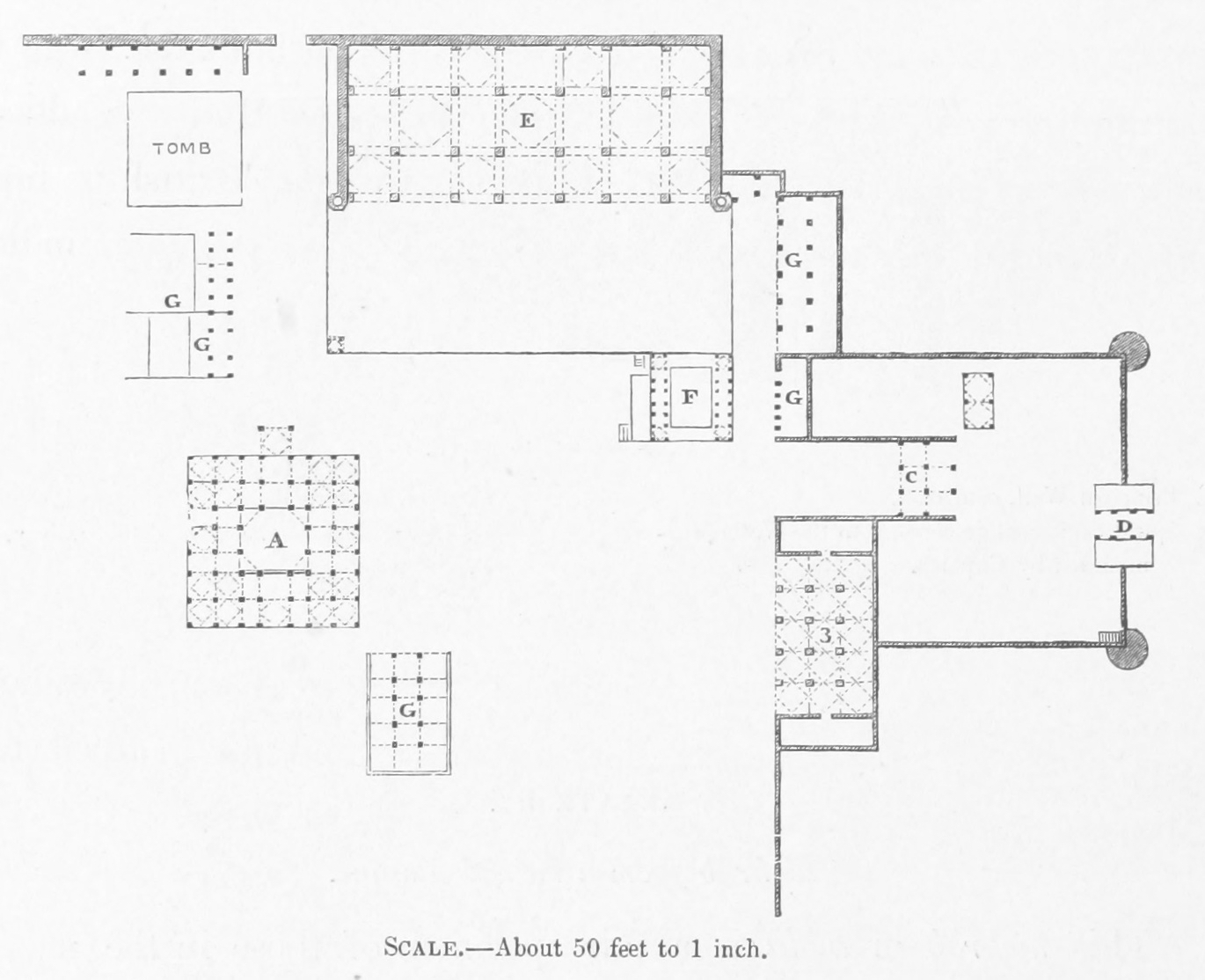
Plan of Roza: A. The Tomb of the Saint B. The Assembly Hall C. The Inner Gateway D. The Outer Gateway E. The Mosque F. The Tank of Ablution G. Miscellaneous Buildings

It is of very pleasing design and has much of the special character of the buildings of that time. Early in the seventeenth century Asaf Khan, the brother of Nur Jahan, ornamented the dome with gold and precious stones. The tomb of Shah e Alam is situated roughly in the center of the east end of roza. The tomb is on a square plan with 12 pillars and a high dome in the centre of the roof, surrounded by double corridors with 24 small domes on top. It has arch-shaped entrance on all sides. The main entrance on the west having a small dome projects out from the wall. On each wall of the mausoleum, there is an entrance in the center. On either side of the entrance, there are three arch-shaped windows, over which an arch-shaped part covered by perforated stone windows. The floor of the tomb is inlaid with black and white marble, the doors are of open cut brass work, and the frame in which the doors aro set, as well as what shews between the door frame and the two stone pillars to the right and left, is of pure white marble beautifully carved and pierced. The tomb itself is completely enclosed by an inner wall of pierced stone. The outer wall in the north is of stone trellis work of the most varied design.

West of the tomb is the mosque, built by Muhammad Salah Badakhshi, with minarets at either end begun by Nizabat Khan and finished by Saif Khan in 1620. The mosque though pleasing in outline and with skilfully constructed domes has much of the ordinary Islamic architecture found in other parts of India, and scarcely belongs to the special Ahmedabad style. To the south of the mosque, a tomb on a plan similar to that of the chief mausoleum having twenty four small domes, is the burying of Shah e Alam's family including Saiyyd Makhdum Alam, the sixth grandson of Shah e Alam. Outside of the wall to the west is an argo reservoir built by the wife of Taj Khan Nariali. The minarets of the mosque were damaged by the 1819 Rann of Kutch earthquake but were restored in 1863.

== Gallery ==
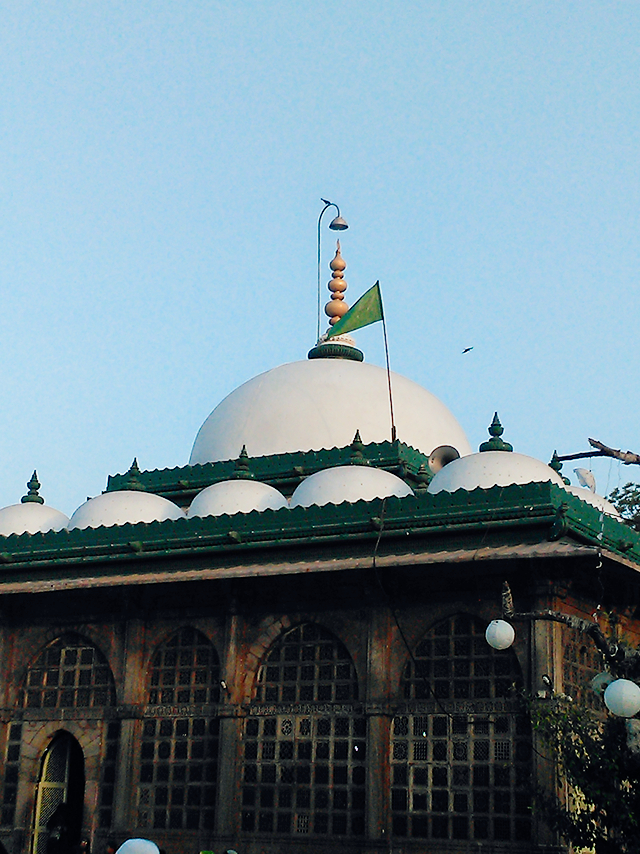
The tomb domes in 2018

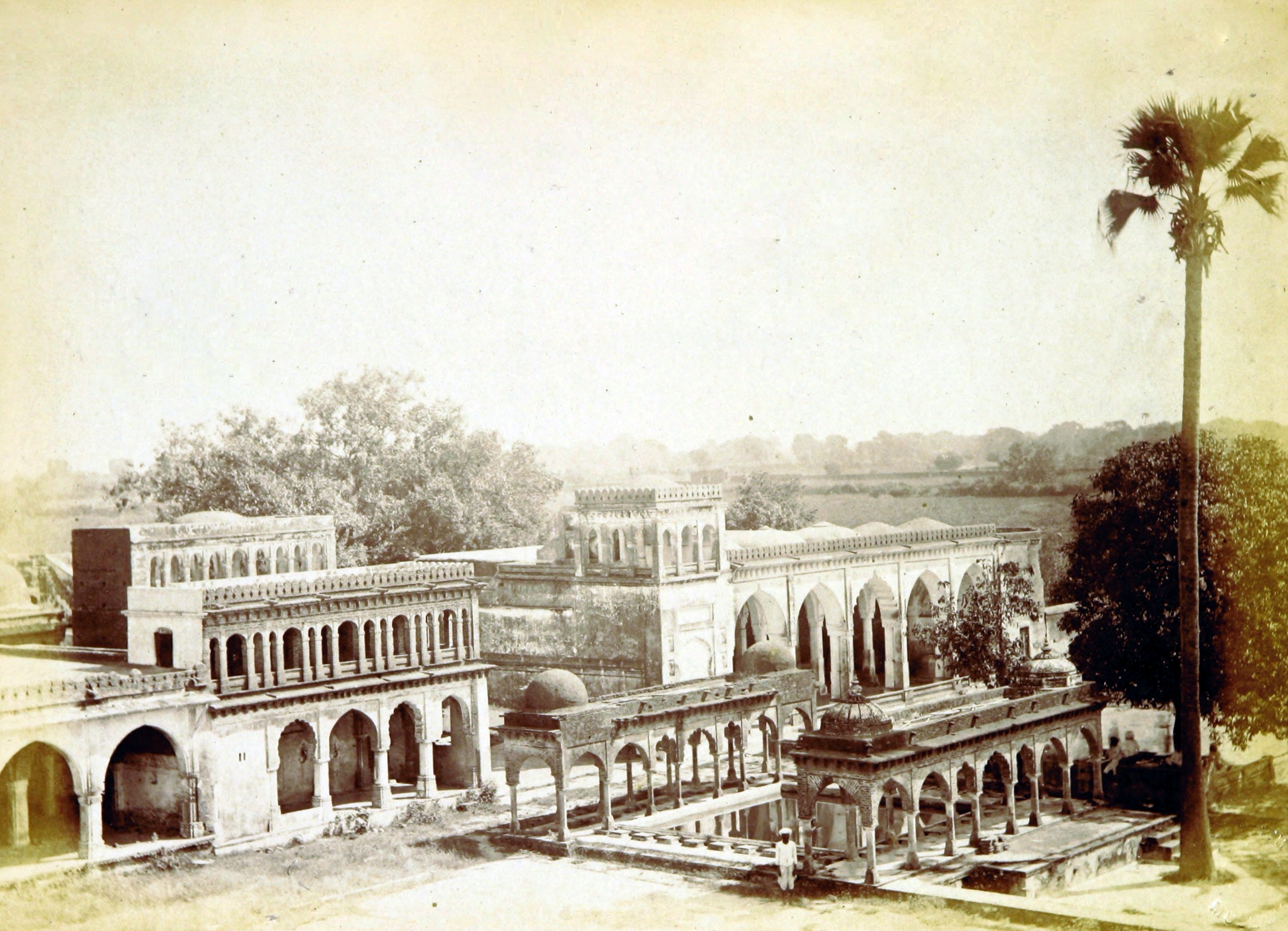
The tomb, assembly hall, and entrance, 1866

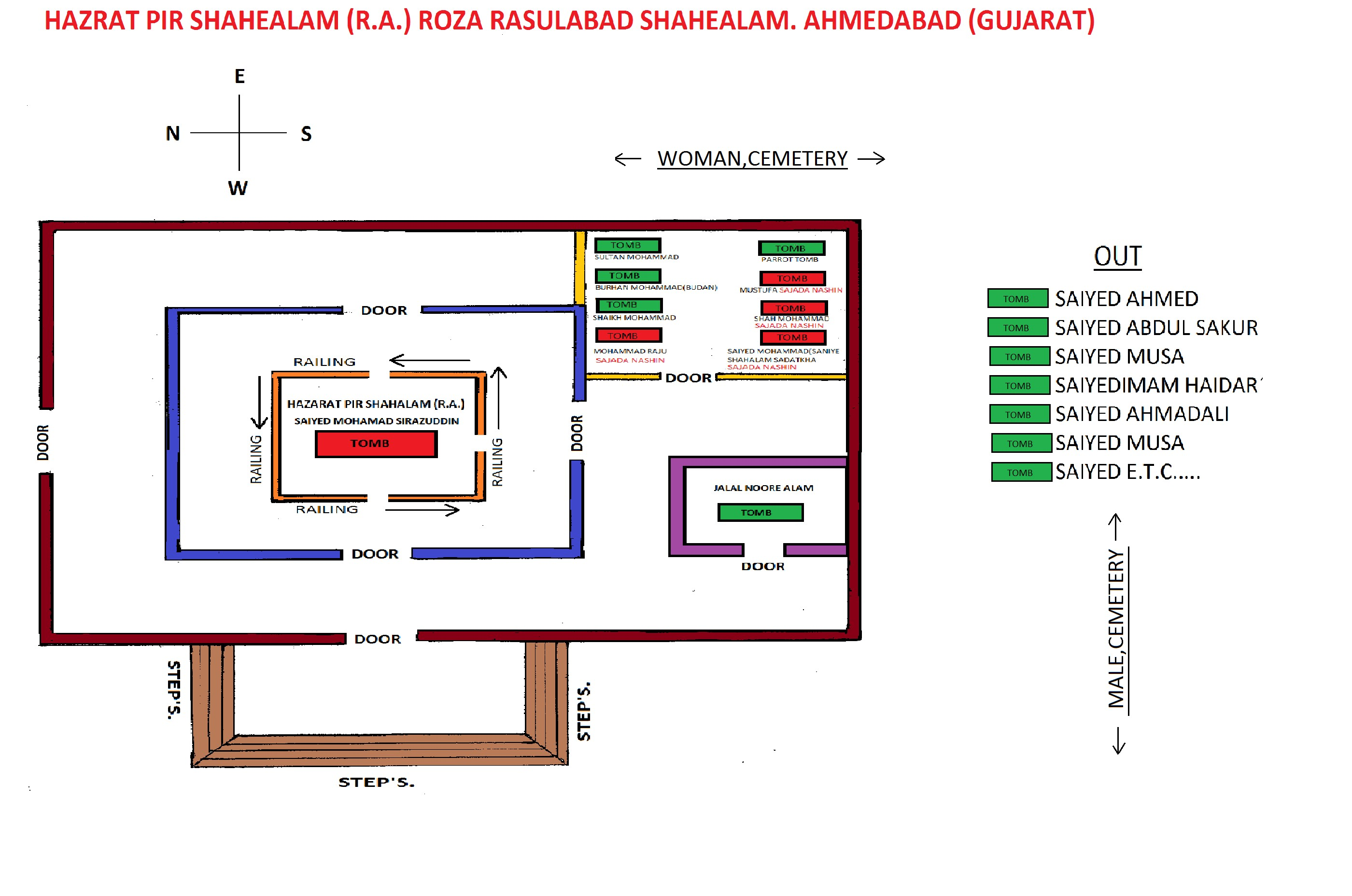
Plan of the tomb

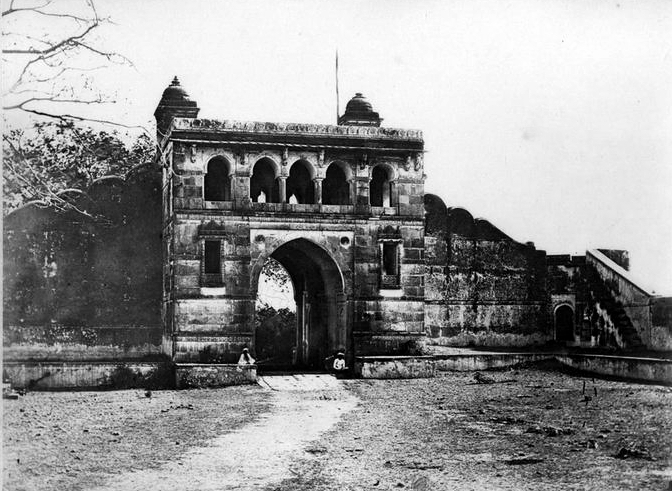
The entrance to the roza in c. 1860s

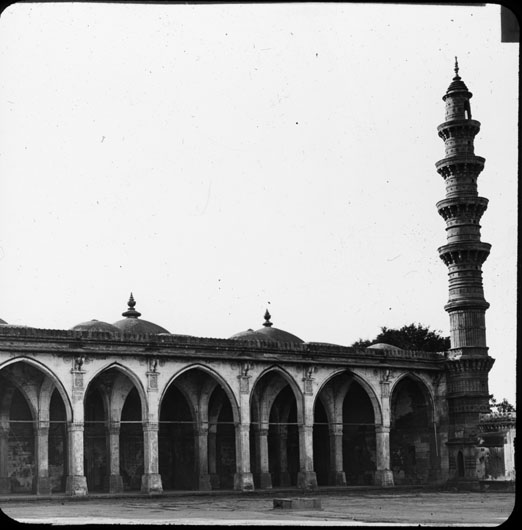
The mosque

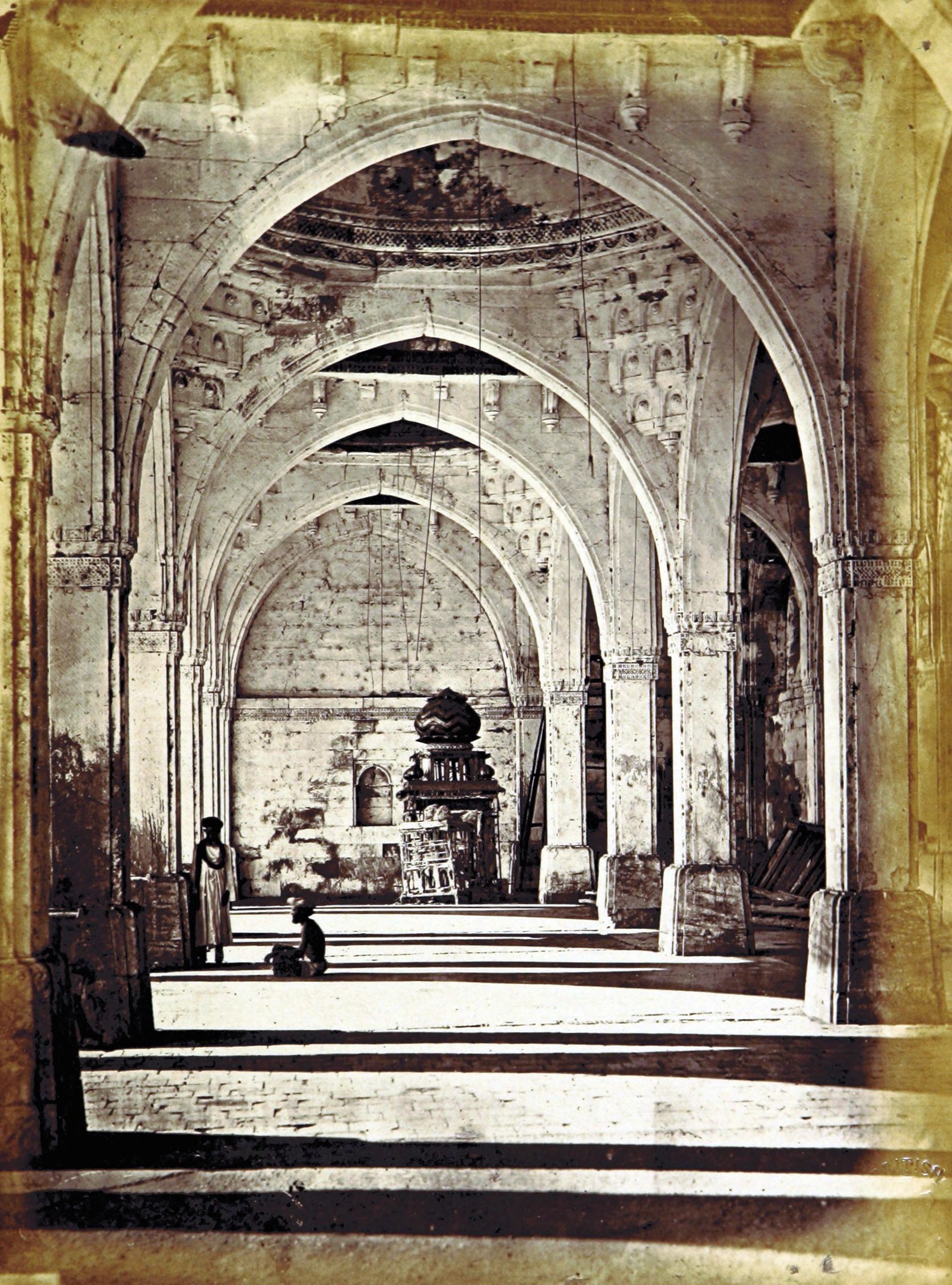
Interior of the mosque, 1866

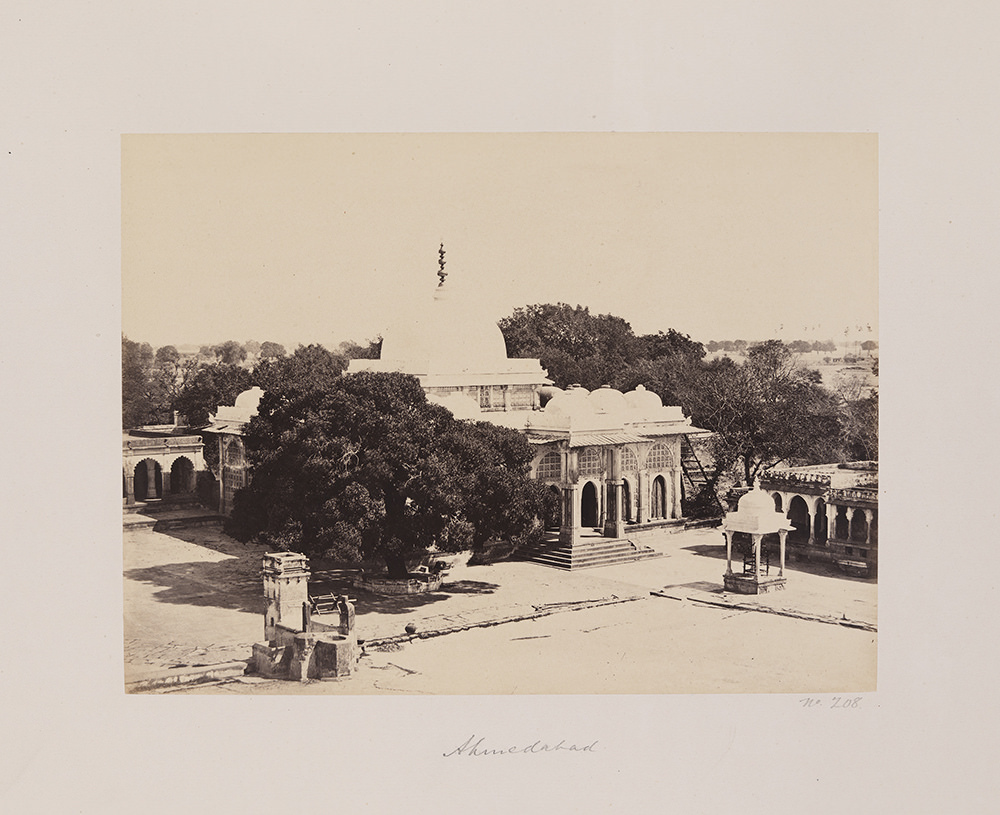
Tomb of Shah-e-Alam in c. 1860s

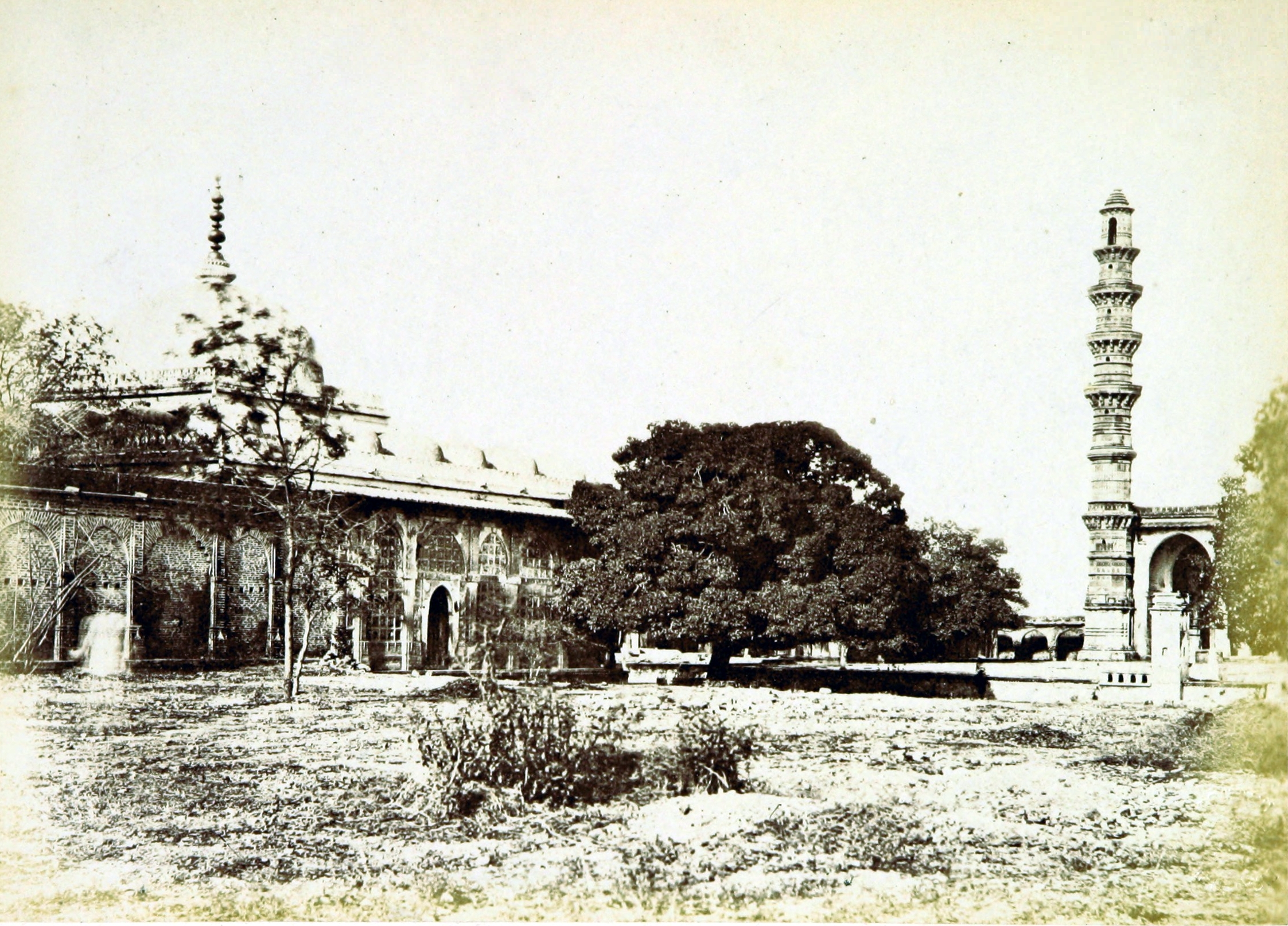
Tomb in 1866

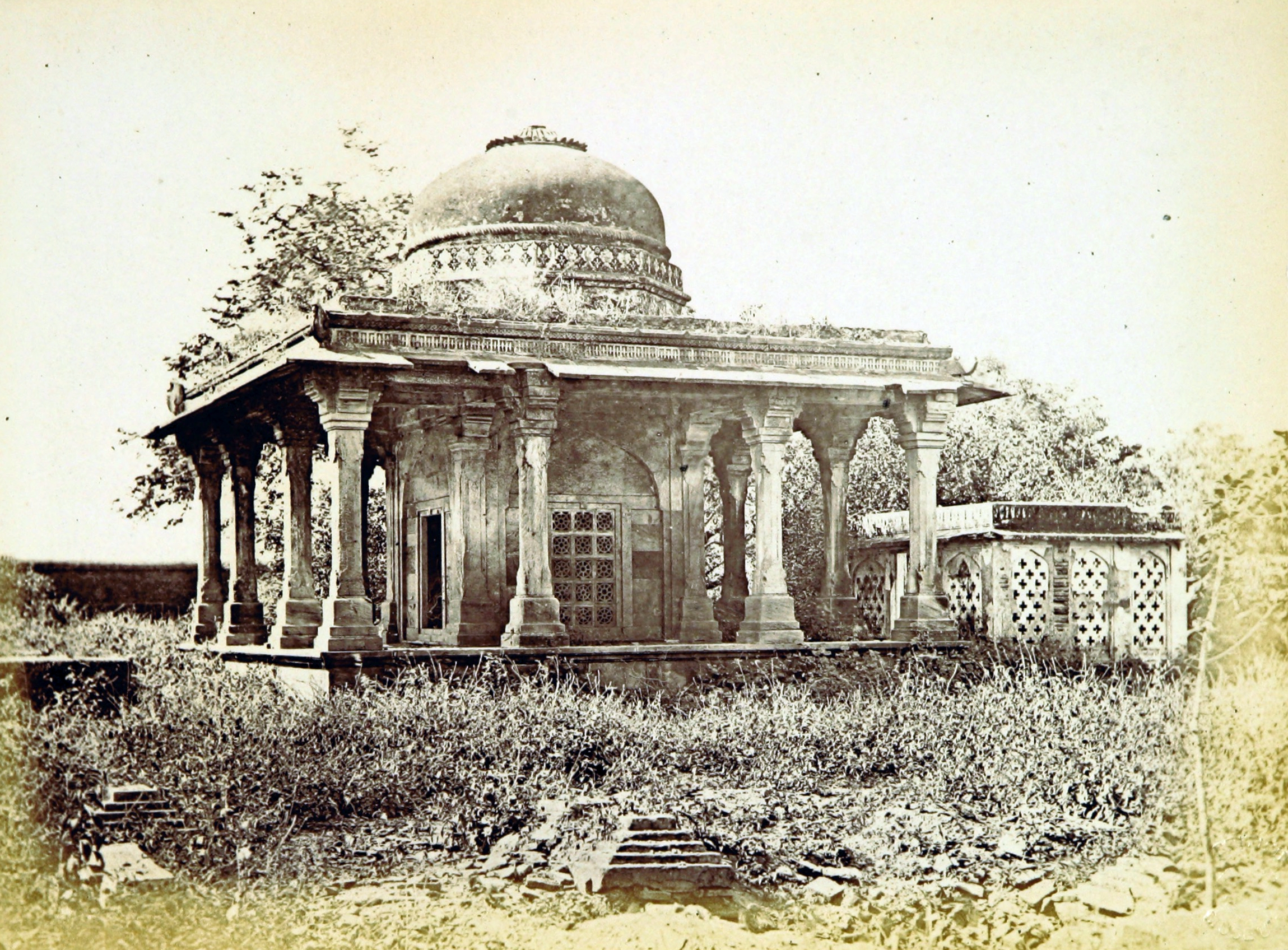
The small tomb near the roza

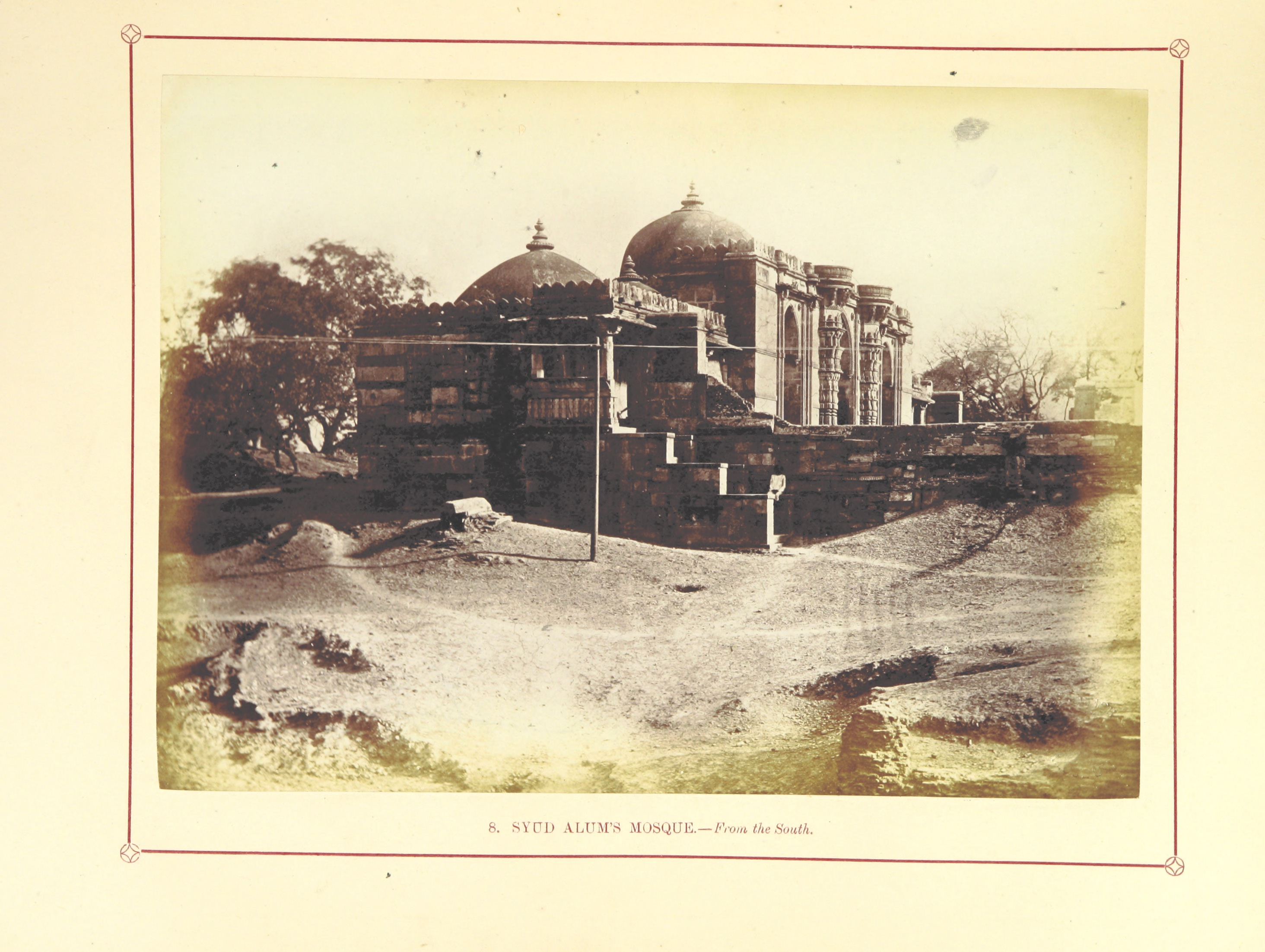
Shah Alam Mosque from the south

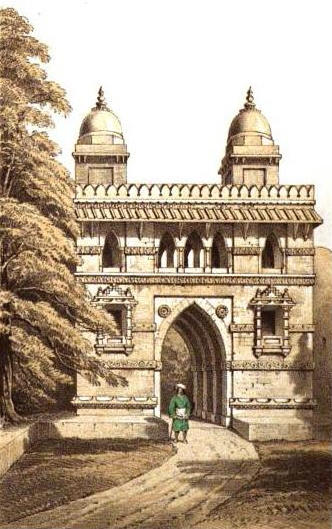
Drawing of Gate of Shah e Alam Roza, 1856
