= Achut Bibi's Mosque =

Mosque and tomb in Gujarat, India

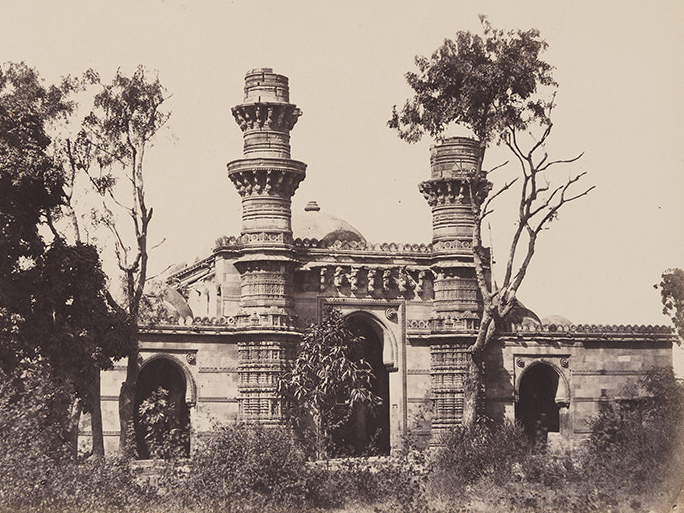
- Achut Bibi's Mosque, 1862

- Location of the mosque and dargah in Ahmedabad

Religion
- Affiliation: Sunni Islam
- Sect: Sufism
- Ecclesiastical or organisational status: Mosque and dargah
- Status: Active

Location
- Location: Dudheshwar, Ahmedabad, Gujarat
- Country: India
- Coordinates: 23°03′20″N 72°34′57″E

Architecture
- Type: Mosque architecture
- Style: Indo-Islamic
- Funded by: Malik Baha-ud-din
- Completed: 1469

Specifications
- Dome: Eight
- Minaret: Two

Monument of National Importance
- Official name: Achut Bibi's Mosque
- Reference no.: N-GJ-24

The Achut Bibi's Mosque, also known as the Achut Bibi's Mosque and Tomb, and locally as the Shahi Masjid, is a Sufi mosque and dargah complex, located on the bank of Sabarmati River in Dudheshwar, Ahmedabad, in the state of Gujarat, India. The mosque structure is a Monument of National Importance.

== History ==
Achut Bibi's mosque was built in 1469 by Haji Malik Bahauddin, entitled Malik Baha-ud-din Imad ul-Mulk, Wazir of Mahmud Begada, for his wife Bibi Achut Kuki whose tomb is close by. Very little is known about Bibi Achut Kuki. Possibly she was an important member of royal harem.

== Architecture ==
The mosque and tomb are enclosed in stone walls. The entrance has two arches and two minarets. completed in the Indo-Islamic style. Its large enclosure was once adorned by seven minarets, three at the outer and two at the inner entrance, and two on the mosque itself. Except the lower parts of the mosque minarets, all seven were thrown down and destroyed in the 1819 Rann of Kutch earthquake.

The tomb complex of Bibi Achut Kuki is located on the south end of the mosque. It is an open canopy with thirty two pillars and eight domes under which several unmarked tombs are located. The exact tomb of Bibi is not identifiable as flagstones are missing. The tomb and mosque was damaged in the 2001 Gujarat earthquake and was restored by Archaeological Survey of India. The structures are also threatened by encroachments.

== See also ==
- Islam in India
- List of mosques in India
- List of Monuments of National Importance in Gujarat
