= Siege of Champaner =

Gujarat Sultanate conquest of Champaner

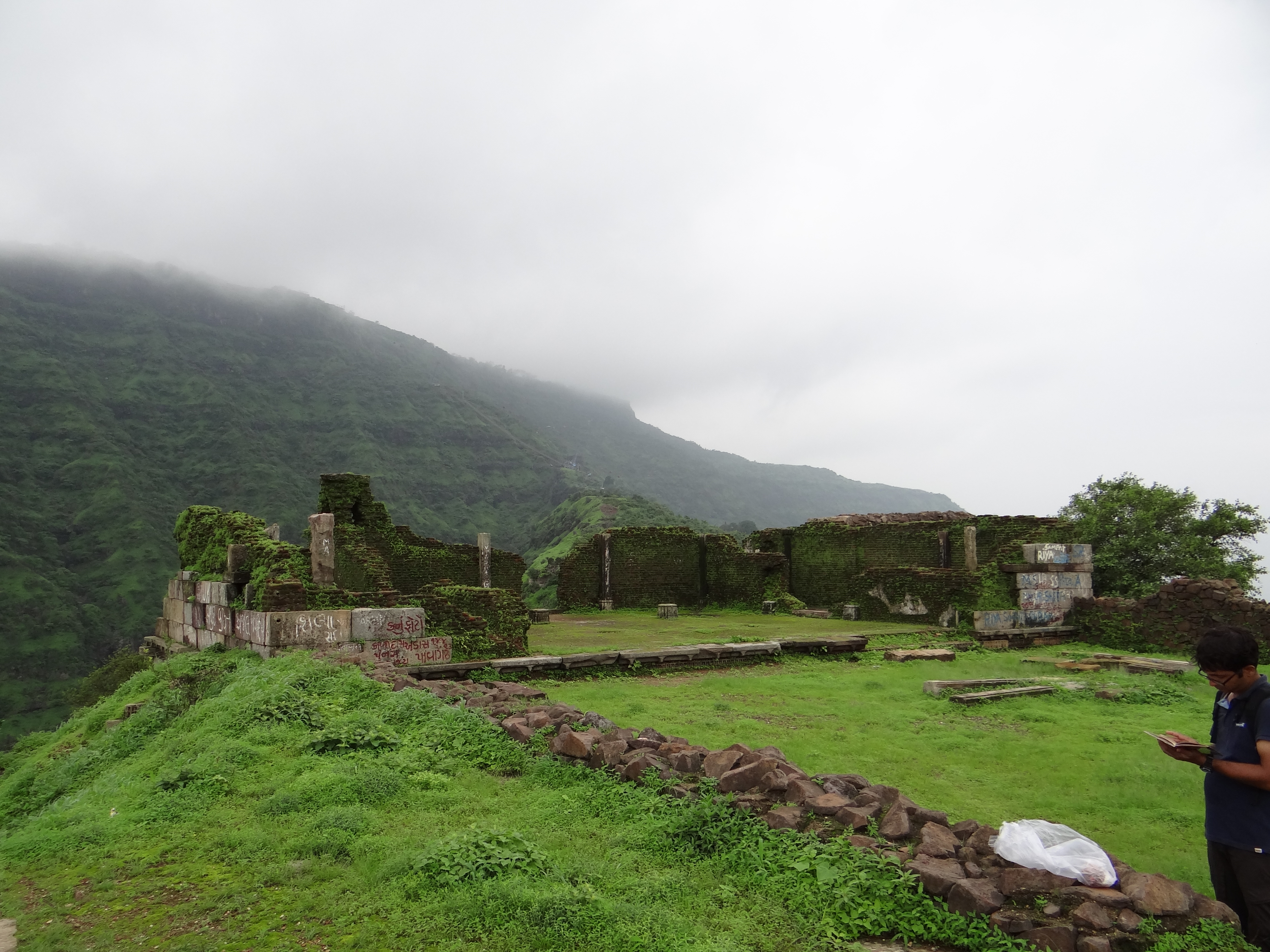
- Remains of Rawal Jaisingh's palace
Date	17 March 1483 – 21 November 1484 (1 year, 8 months and 4 days)
Location	Champaner, Pavagadh, Gujarat 22°29′N 73°32′E
Result	Gujarat Sultanate victory
Territorial changes	Territories from Dahod to Godhra annexed to Gujarat Sultanate

Belligerents
Gujarat Sultanate	Kingdom of Champaner

Commanders and leaders
Mahmud Begada; Malik Ayyaz Sultani; Taj Khan; Azd-ul-Mulk; Bahram Khan; Ikhtiyar Khan; Saiyid Badi Alangdar; Malik Sarang; Muhafiz Khan; Shaykhan bin Kabir †	Rawal Jai Singh (executed); Saiya Bankalia; Dungarsingh †; Sewa Rai †; Varshi †; Sarang Jadeja †; Karan †; Jethmal †; Survaiyo Chandravan †

Strength
Unknown	60,000

Casualties and losses
Heavy	All killed
- Location within Gujarat Siege of Champaner (India)

The Siege of Champaner (1483–1484) also known as Siege of Pavagadh and Siege of Champaner-Pavagadh was a major military campaign by the Gujarat Sultanate under Sultan Mahmud Begada against the Rajput kingdom of Champaner ruled by Rawal Jai Singh. The Gujarat Sultans were determined to establish complete sovereignty over Gujarat by eliminating semi-independent Rajput kingdoms. In January 1483, Mahmud Begada marched from Ahmedabad to conquer the principality, which had long maintained ties with the rival Malwa Sultanate. After a prolonged siege lasting twenty months, marked by fierce Rajput resistance and a failed intervention by Malwa ruler Ghiyath Shah, the Gujarat forces finally captured the hill fort of Pavagadh on 21 November 1484. Rawal Jai Singh was captured and later executed. The territories of Champaner were absorbed by Gujarat Sultanate. Following the victory, Mahmud Begada renamed the city Muhammadabad. It served as the new capital of Gujarat Sultanate for the next fifty years.

== Background ==
The Rajput kingdom of Champaner stretched from Dahod to Godhra, making it a buffer between the Gujarat Sultanate and Malwa Sultanate. Both Gujarat and Malwa valued its position. Champaner struggled to maintain independence despite paying tribute to Gujarat. Gujarat wanted it to guard against Malwa's aggression, and Malwa to preserve Champaner as a friendly ally. Whenever Gujarat threatened, it sought Malwa's support. The Rajput chiefs such as the Gehlots of Junagarh, the Badhels of Sankodhara and Jagat, the Girasias of Idar, and the Rawals of Champaner were often hostile towards the Sultans. In 1415, Ahmad Shah I (r. 1411–1442) invaded the Hindu sacred town of Siddhpur in North Gujarat. He destroyed the idols in the Rudramahalaya temple and converted the temple into a mosque. The Rajput states of Eastern Gujarat recognized that the young Sultan was not only seeking military conquests but was also actively involved to destroy Hindu religious shrines. In 1416, the four rulers viz. Trimbakdas of Champaner, Punja of Idar, Siri of Nandod, and Mandlik of Jhalawar formed a confederacy against Ahmad Shah. They invited Hoshang Shah of Malwa who invaded Gujarat. Ahmad Shah withdrew to confront Hoshang Shah. Two years later, in 1418, Narasinhadas succeeded Trimbakdas. Ahmad Shah again marched to Champaner and plundered the country compelling him to pay tribute. In 1442, Muhammad Shah II (r. 1442–1451) succeeded his father, Ahmad Shah. At the same time, Gangadas succeeded Narasinhadas who stopped paying tribute. Ahmad Shah was determined to levy tribute. Therefore, in 1449, Muhammad invaded Champaner. He defeated Raval Gangadas in battle. The Raval took shelter in the hill-fortress of Pavagadh. Muhammad Shah laid siege on the fort. Gangadas sent envoy to Mahmud Khalji (r. 1436–1469) of Malwa looking for help. The Sultan taking the opportunity invaded Gujarat in 1451 and besieged the frontier town of Dahod. Muhammad Shah II lifted the siege and retreated to his capital to save it from attack. Gangadas soon joined Mahmud Khalji but were defeated by the newly crowned Ahmad Shah II (r. 1451–1459) at the battle of Kapadvanj.

== Prelude ==
Sultan Mahmud Begada (r. 1459–1511) was determined to establish complete and undisputed sovereignty over Gujarat. As part of this policy, he sought to conquer the semi-independent Rajput principalities within the region. The kingdom of Champaner was a key target, as the Sultan was unwilling to tolerate its continued existence as an autonomous entity. In 1471–72, Mahmud Begada while besieging Girnar received intelligence that Jai Singh of Champaner, had grown defiant. Emboldened by the support and patronage of Ghiyath Shah of Malwa, Jai Singh had allowed rebels from Baroda and Dabhoi to pass through his territory. He was suspected of helping the rebellions himself. Jai Singh ravaged the territory between Champaner and Ahmadabad. The Sultan dispatched Jamal-ud-din Muhammad titled Muhafiz Khan to govern this tract. Mahmud Begada marched from Mustafabad to punish the Raja of Champaner. However, he was unable to reach Champaner that year. Upon receiving news of disturbances caused by the Malabari pirates in Kutch, Mahmud Begada was forced to divert his forces immediately. In January 1474, he launched another campaign against Champaner. He himself remained at Saonli (Rasulabad) near the bank of the Mahi River, from where he dispatched troops to plunder the territories of Champaner. The final conquest of Champaner could not be done due to these circumstances. In 1482, a severe drought struck Gujarat, leading to a devastating famine in which many thousands died. In response to the shortage of supplies, Malik Sida, the Mahmud Begada's officer in the Baroda territory, led a plundering raid into the Champaner region. The raid was driven back with heavy losses by the forces of the local ruler, Jai Singh also known as Rai Patai, the ruler of Champaner. Persian chronicles present a different version of events. They claim that the Rai of Champaner initiated hostilities by attacking Malik Sida, killing him along with several of his men, and capturing two elephants together with the camp's goods and equipment. However, the same sources also indicate that it was Malik Sida who first violated the peace by raiding Champaner's territory, thereby provoking the Rai's response. The Champaner chief had never fully submitted to the authority of the Gujarat Sultanate, which made his lands an attractive target for such raids. Nevertheless, Mahmud Begada viewed Malik Sida's death as a threat to his sovereignty, and therefore resolved to invade Champaner in order to punish the Rai and bring the region under firm control. The Raja of Idar also collaborated with the Sultan in the campaign.

== Siege ==
Mahmud Begada marched from Ahmedabad on 11 January 1483 AD. After successive marches, he reached Baroda and established his camp there. Learning of the Sultan's advance, Rawal Jai Singh became alarmed and immediately sent envoys offering peace and submission. Mahmud Begada rejected the proposal, declaring that the matter would be settled only by the sword. Thereupon, Rawal Jai Singh withdrew to his strong mountain fortress and prepared to defend it to the last. Mahmud Begada first dispatched an advance force under Taj Khan, Azd-ul-Mulk, Bahram Khan, and Ikhtiyar Khan to besiege the fort. The Sultan himself then advanced, passing Champaner, and encamped at the village of Karnai on the Malwa road. He appointed Saiyid Badi Alangdar to guard the supply route and ensure the arrival of provisions. The Rajputs offered minor resistance but retreated to the fort to continue the war defensively.

=== Siege of Champaner Fort ===
Mahmud Begada proceeded to besiege to the fort of Champaner-Pavagadh. On 17 March 1483, his advance troops reached the vicinity of the fort. The Sultan himself soon joined the besieging army after plundering the Pala territory (in Naswadi Taluka) and killing many of its inhabitants. Even at this stage, Rawal Jai Singh was still hoping for a peaceful resolution. He again sent his envoy with a proposal for complete submission. He admitted that the two elephants captured earlier had died but offered to pay heavy compensation instead. Sultan Mahmud rejected the offer again and insisted that he was determined to conquer and annex Champaner to his kingdom. The disappointed envoy returned and conveyed the Sultan's firm decision to the Raval. Jai Singh resolved to defend his principality at all costs. According to Firishta, he assembled a large force of 60,000 men, reinforced by troops sent by neighbouring chiefs. Taking advantage of their strong position on the hill, the Rajputs launched fierce attacks on the besiegers from above. The strong assault forced Sultan Mahmud to temporarily lift the siege and fight on the open plains. In the following engagement the Rajputs were defeated. They retreated in good order with a compact force of about 12,000 men. The Sultan pursued them to the foot of the hill fortress but could not launch an attack. He personally supervised the construction of defensive covered paths and the placements of mines. He then shifted his camp to Girnari. Provisions proved scarce during the siege. Supplies from Ahmedabad and Mustafabad were often blocked by the Rajputs. The Sultan appointed Saiyid Badi Alangdar to secure the routes. But one of the convoys was ambushed, and the baggage were captured with heavy losses. Despite these setbacks, Mahmud Begada pressed on with the siege. During the prolonged siege, Rawal Jai Singh made a second attempt at peace. He offered heavy compensation in gold and rations, but this offer was also firmly rejected by the Sultan.

=== Malwa involvement ===
Finding no hope of peace with Mahmud Begada, Rawal Jai Singh tried to secure help from Malwa like his father Gangadas had done earlier. He sent his minister Sewa Rai to Sultan Ghiyath Shah (r. 1469–1501) of Malwa with a message reminding him of their old alliance. He requested military assistance to lift the siege, promising to pay one lakh tankas for each day of march as expenses. Giyath Shah proceeded with a large army from Mandu and halted at Nalcha to organize his forces. This put Mahmud Begada in a difficult situation. He was unwilling to abandon the half-conquered territory of Champaner, yet he could not ignore the invading Malwa army. Retreating would have left his army dangerously trapped between the forces of Champaner and Malwa. Mahmud Begada left a portion of his army to continue the siege while marched with a large force at Dahod. Ghiyath Shah's objective was to force the Gujarati Sultan to lift the siege of Champaner. However, he had not expected Mahmud Begada to arrive so quickly. After assessing the situation, he decided to retreat. He summoned the Ulamas and Qadis, who unanimously issued fatwa that providing help to the Rawal Jai Singh against a fellow Muslim ruler engaged in Jihad would be contrary to Islamic law. Ghiyath Shah's incompetence had thus been validated through religious grounds, and he withdrew and returned to Malwa.

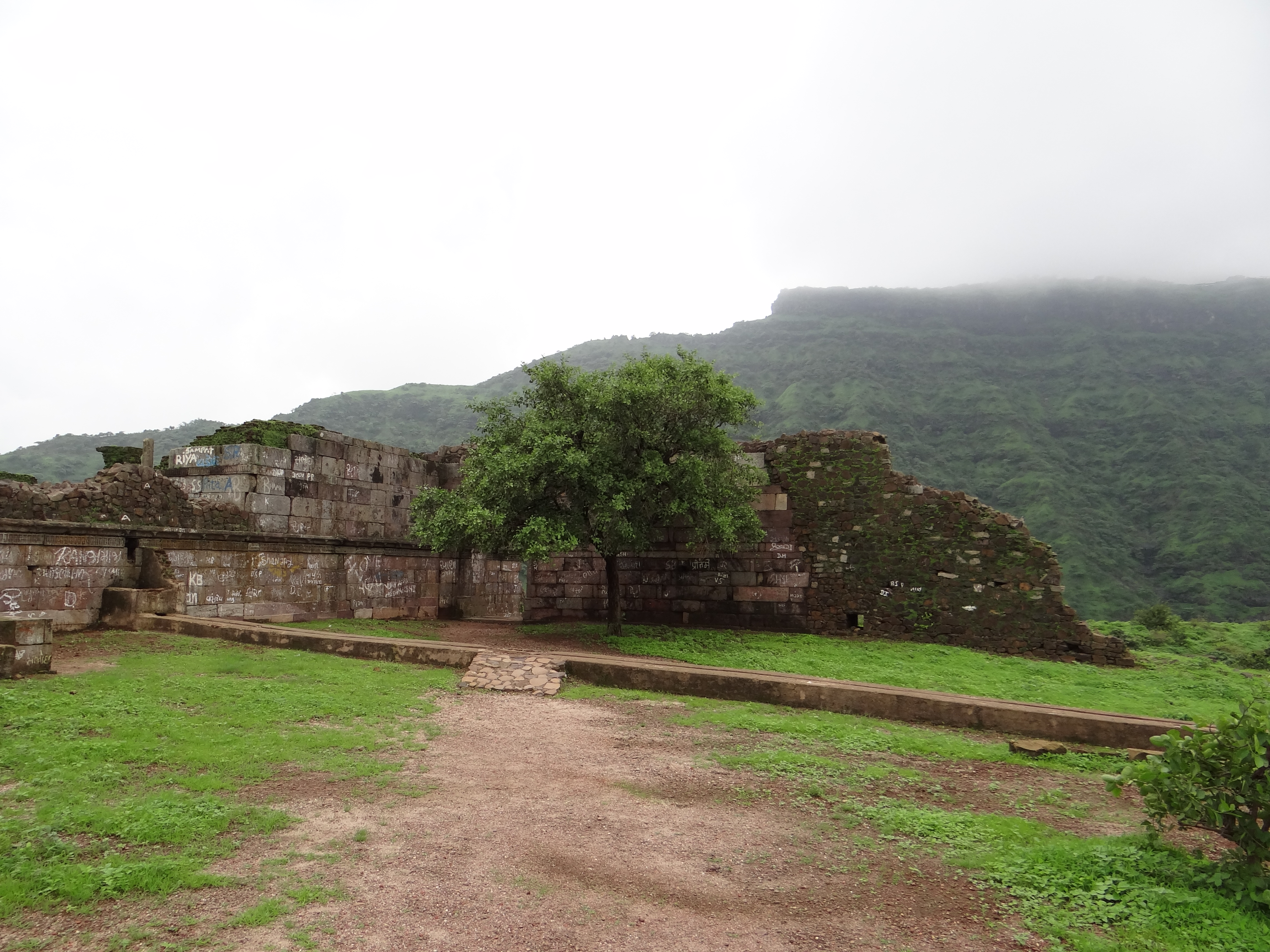
Entrance for ruins of Jai Singh's Palace

=== Capture of Champaner Fort ===
After the retreat of Ghiyath Shah, Mahmud Begada was furious upon learning that Rawal Jai Singh had sought help from the ruler of Malwa. He returned to Champaner declared that he would not return to Ahmedabad until the conquest is completed. The Sultan intensified the siege progress. Taking advantage of the Rajputs' religious practice in the morning for bathing and worship outside the fort, Mahmud Begada planned a surprise attack. He ordered Kiwam-ul-Mulk Malik Sarang to position himself inside the covered ways to block the Rajputs from re-entering the fort. On 20 November 1484, when the Rajputs returned, Kiwam-ul-Mulk's men attacked. A battle ensued at the second gate of the fort. The Rajputs fought back killing Kiwam-ul-Mulk's most of his troops. The Gujarati army suffered heavy losses in the engagement. Meanwhile, Malik Ayaz succeeded in creating a breach in the western wall. He occupied a position near the main gate and fought desperately to hold it. The Rajputs made repeated attempts to dislodge him, but timely reinforcements from the Sultan helped secure the position. In a desperate move, the defenders set fire to a nearby building to block the gate, but the flames spread to their own structures, causing chaos inside the fort. According to Muhnot Nainsi, Jai Singh's brother-in-law, Saiya Bankalia, betrayed by revealing the keys of the fort to the Sultan. As a result, the main gate was opened. 21 November 1484, the Gujarati troops finally entered the fort. The long and hard-fought siege that had lasted nearly two years thus came to an end with the fall of the powerful Rajput stronghold. The Rajput women, asked by their men, committed Jauhar with their children. The men numbering only 700 fought in a last stand, but all were killed soon. After a prolonged siege lasting nearly twenty months, Mahmud Begada successfully conquered Champaner.

== Aftermath ==
The bardic chronicle Ras Mala states that six rajas or Rajput princes died fighting on behalf of Rawal Jaysingh. It identifies several of them as Vershi, Sarang Jadeja, Karan, Jathmal, and Survaiyo Chandravan. After the capture of the fort, Rawal Jai Singh and his chief minister Dungarsingh were taken prisoner. They were brought in front of the Sultan on 22 November 1484 who asked them to accept Islam, but the latter refused. Mahmud did not want to antagonize the people by putting the Rawal to death. The Sultan placed them under the care of Muhafiz Khan until their wounds healed. According to Muhnot Nainsi, Saiya Bankalia disclosed the hidden treasure to the Sultan. After that Mahmud ordered his execution. His head was placed on top of the pile of slain Rajput soldiers' heads. Two daughters of Jai Singh were sent to the harem and a prince was adopted by Saiful-Mulk. He was raised Muslim and renamed Malik Hussain Bahmani. He later received the title Nizam-ul-Mulk and became Amir of Idar. Five months later, once Jaisingh and his minister had recovered from their wounds, both of them were brought before Sultan Mahmud Begada. The Sultan asked them to embrace Islam. Both refused. Mahmud consulted with Ulama and ordered their execution. They were brought to a hilltop of Siyadangiri. The head of Rawal Jai Singh was struck off and displayed on a gibbet. His minister, Dungarsingh, snatched a sword from a soldier, killed one of the Sultan's relatives, Shaykhan bin Kabir, with a single blow, and was then overpowered and slain in 1485 AD. This marked the end of the Chauhan Rajput dynasty of Champaner.

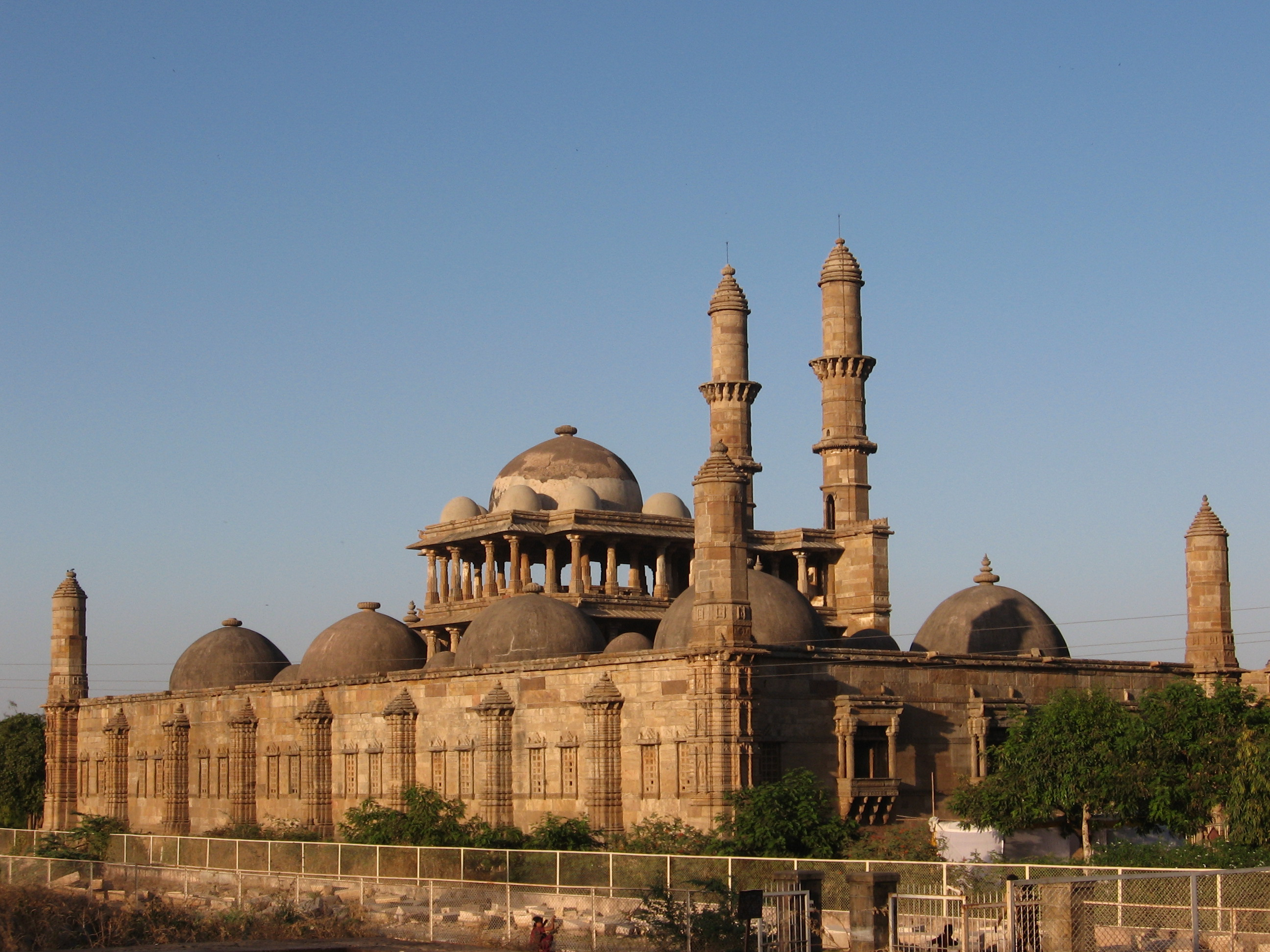
Jama Mosque, Champaner

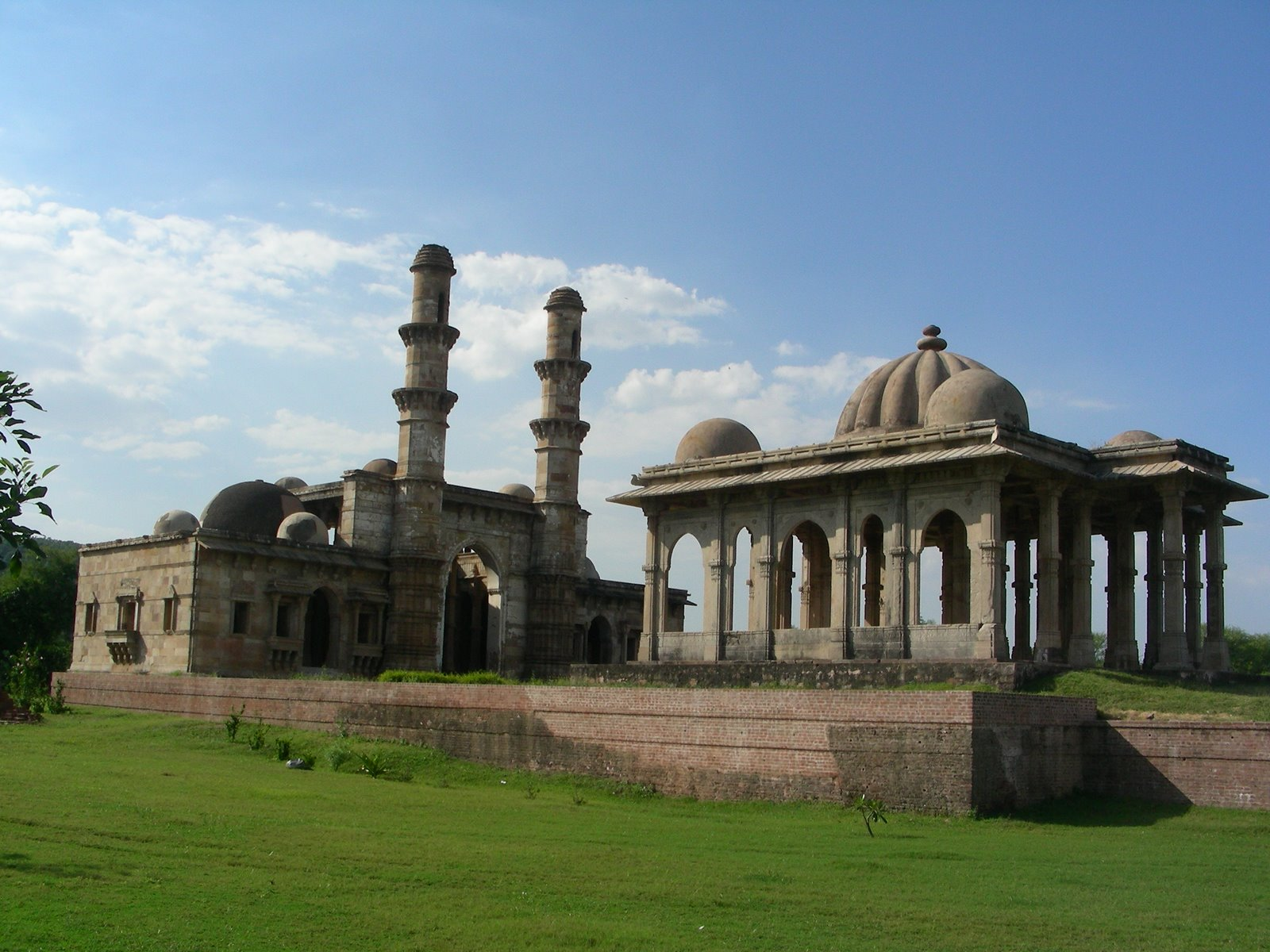
Kevda Mosque

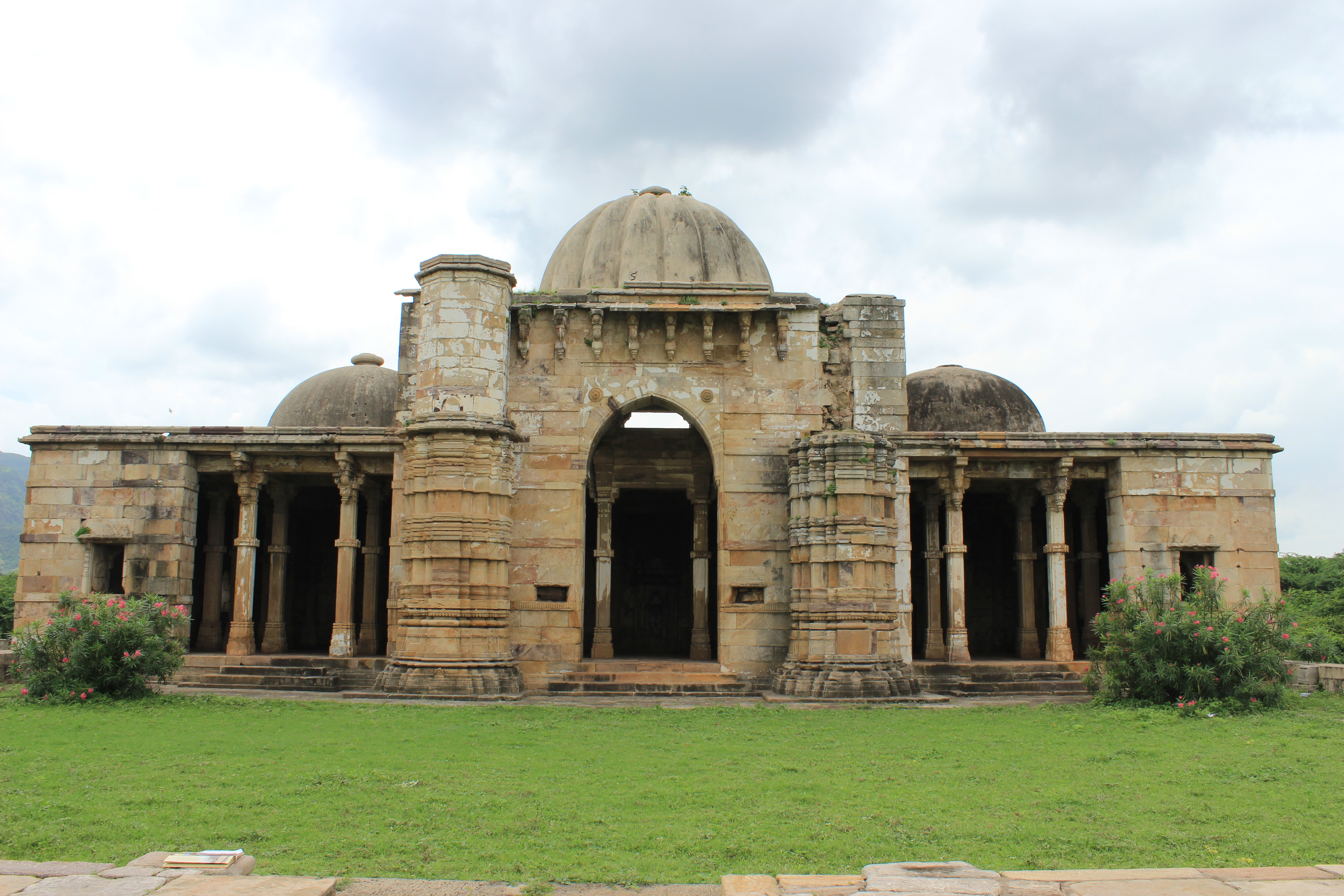
Lila Gumbaj Ki Mosque

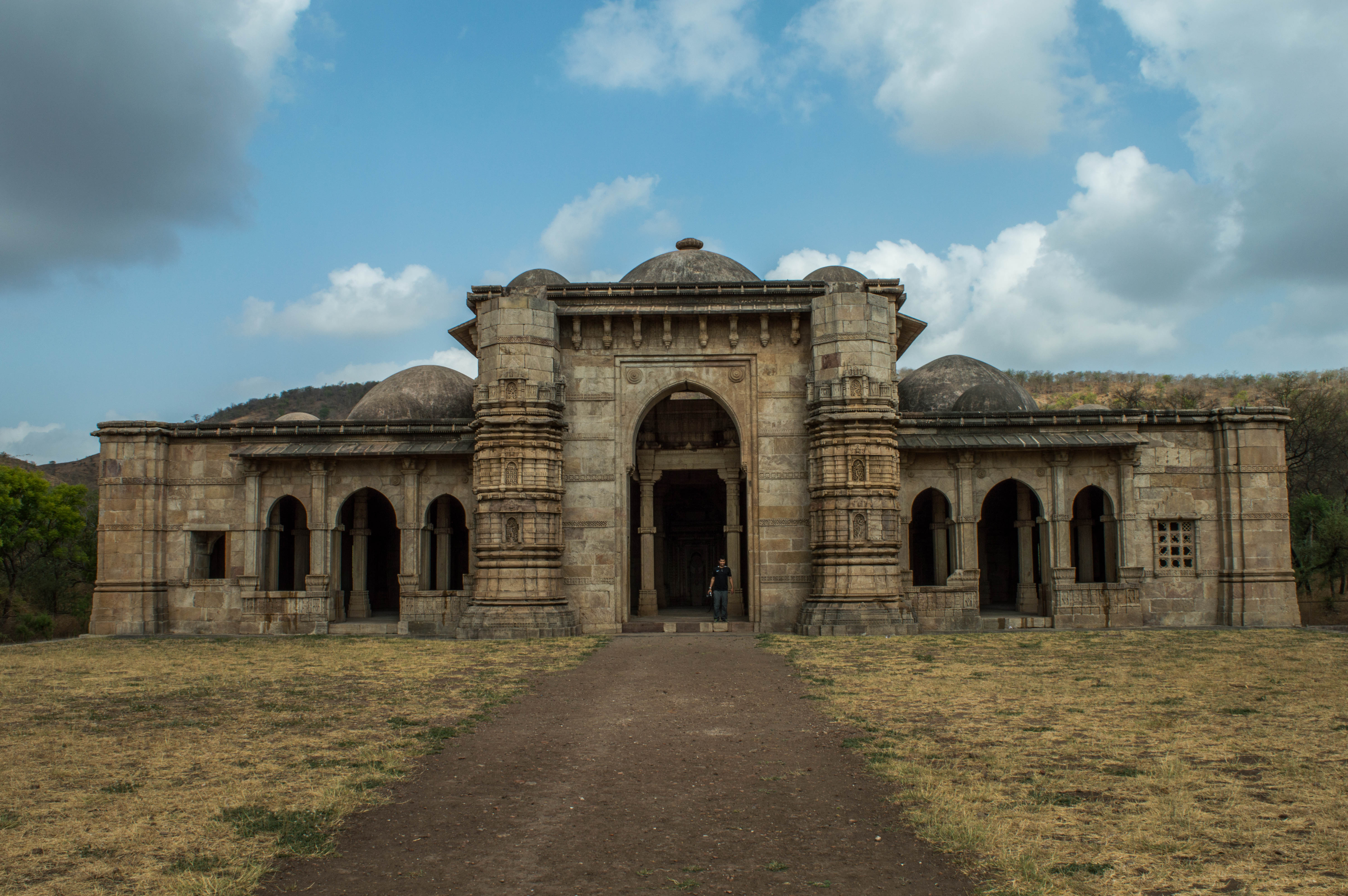
Nagina Mosque

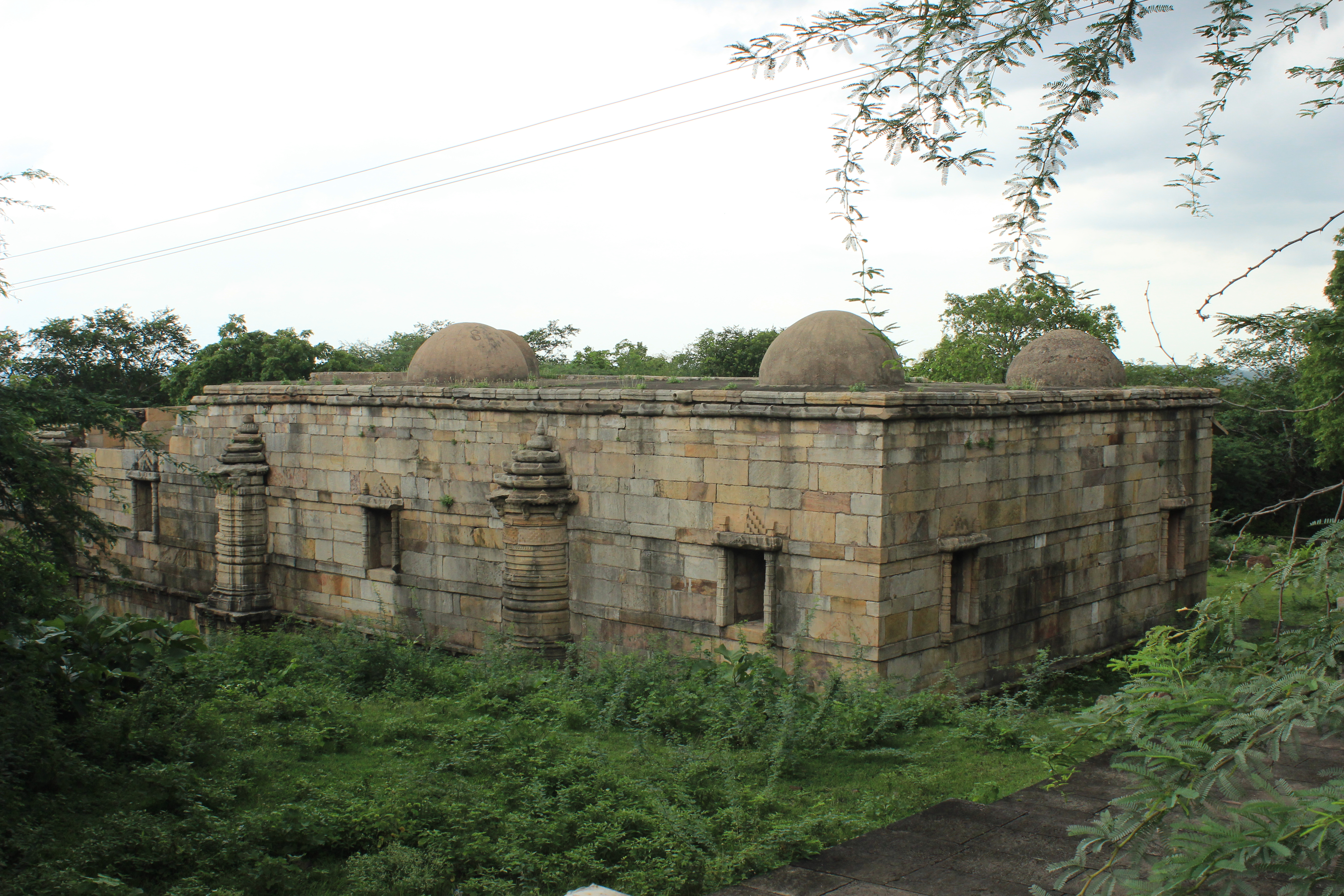
Bawaman Mosque

Mahmud Begada converted the Hindu city into a Muslim capital renaming it Muhammadabad and have it an honorific mint-epithet of Shahr-i-Mukarram transl. the illustrious town. He built a strong outer wall, citadel, a royal palace, and a beautiful Jami Masjid. Gardens with fountains were laid out on the outskirts. Rich settlements grew there, and the city became capital and mint town of Gujarat Sultanate for fifty years till 1535. Two Arabic inscription on the two gateways of Champaner fort Halol and Godhra constructed by Mahmud Begada dates the conquest of the fort. Another Persian inscription from the Jami Masjid exists from his reign.

== See also ==
- Siege of Diu (1546)
- Siege of Diu (1538)
- Battle of Kapadvanj

== Bibliography ==
- Commissariat, M. S. (1938). A History of Gujarat. Vol. I. Ahmadabad: Longmans Green & Co. Ltd.
- Dosabhai, Edalji (1986) [1894]. A History of Gujarat (PDF). Kessinger Publishing. ISBN 978-1-4367-3303-8.
- Chaube, J. (1975). History of Gujarat Kingdom, 1458-1537. Munshiram Manoharlal Publishers. ISBN 978-0-88386-573-6.
- Day, Upendra Nath (1965). Medieval Malwa: A Political and Cultural History, 1401-1562. Munshi Ram Manohar Lal. ISBN 978-81-215-0401-0.
- Goetz, H. (1946). "THE SIEGE OF CHAMPANER-PĀWĀGADH BY SULTĀN MAHMUD I BEGAḌA In A. D. 1482-1484". Proceedings of the Indian History Congress. 9: 227–232. ISSN 2249-1937.
- Shafqat, Arshia (2008). "Pre-Annexation Sultanate: Administration Under Gujarat Sultans". Proceedings of the Indian History Congress. 69: 251–264. ISSN 2249-1937.
- Bano, Ajaz (1984). "The Zamindars in the Sultanate of Gujrat: 1407-1572". Proceedings of the Indian History Congress. 45: 337–344. ISSN 2249-1937.
- Haig, W. (1928). The Cambridge History of India: Turks and Afghans, edited by W. Haig. Vol. III. Cambridge University Press.
- Habib, Mohammad; Nizami, Khaliq Ahmad, eds. (1970). A Comprehensive History of India: The Delhi Sultanat (A.D. 1206-1526). Vol. V. People's Publishing House.
- Patel, G. D., ed. (1972). Gujarat State Gazetters: Panchamahals District (PDF). Ahmedabad: Government Press and Stationary Department.
- Campbell, James M. (1879). Gazetter of the Bombay Presidency. Vol. III Kaira and Panch Mahals.
- Campbell, James Macnabb (1896). James Macnabb Campbell (ed.). History of Gujarát. Gazetteer of the Bombay Presidency. Vol. I(II). The Government Central Press.
