= Muhafiz Khan =

15th century vizier of the Gujarat Sultanate

- Jamal-ud-Din Muhammad

Vizier of the Gujarat Sultanate

Muhafiz Khan
- In office 1481–Unknown
- Appointed by: Mahmud Begada
- Preceded by: Malik Baha-ud-din
- Succeeded by: Unknown
- In office 1471–1480

Faujdar and Kotwal of Ahmedabad

Muhafiz Khan (born Jamal-ud-din Muhammad; fl. 1471 – c. 1492) was a high-ranking noble and administrator of the Gujarat Sultanate under Sultan Mahmud Begada. He served as the Faujdar and Kotwal of Ahmedabad in 1471 and later rose to become Wazir (Vizier) and Naib-ul-Mulk (Deputy of the state) in 1481. He is best known for the finely carved Muhafiz Khan Mosque built near the Delhi Gate in Ahmedabad in 1492.

== Biography ==
Jamal-ud-din Muhammad was the son of Shaikh Muin-ud-din al-Quraishi. In 1471, Sultan Mahmud Begada appointed him as the Faujdar of Ahmadabad, bestowing the title Muhafiz Khan. He vigorously suppressed disorder, publicly executing some 500 robbers. Firishta noted that he maintained 1,700 bargir-i-khas (special cavalry). He was later made Mustaufi Mamalik and granted full government of the city and its dependencies. In 1473, he was tasked to execute Raja Bhim of Dwarka. He chained and impaled the former monarch. The body was hewn into pieces. In 1480, Khudawand Khan conspired to depose the Sultan and place his son Ahmad Khan to the throne. Muhafiz Khan, the Kotwal of Ahmedabad stayed loyal promptly took effective measures to prevent the expected insurrection. After Malik Baha-ud-din Imad-ul-Mulk's death in 1480, Muhafiz Khan succeeded as Wazir and Naib-ul-Mulk of Gujarat Sultanate. His grandson was the historian Husam Khan author of Tarikh-i-Bahadur Shahi and the Tarikh-i-Husam Khani. In 1484, Jayasinha of Junagadh and his prime minister Dungarsi was captured following the siege of Champaner. Muhafiz Khan was tasked to look after the prisoners.

== Architectural contribution ==
In 1492, Muhafiz Khan's mosque was built near the Delhi Gate in Ahmedabad. Its minarets stand at the ends of the building and are richly carved with floral panels. An inscription on the middle one records that the mosque was completed on 14 Rajab 897 A.H. corresponding to 12 May 1492 in the reign of Mahmud Begada for Jamal-ud-din.

"This edifice (was completed) in the reign of the Sultan of Sultans, Shams-ul-Muluk wal haq Nasir ud-dunya wad-din Abul Fath Mahmud Shah, son of Muhammad Shah, etc., for Jamal-ud-din, the son of Shaikh Muin-ud-din al-Quraishi, who received from the same Sultan the title of Muhafiz Khan, on the fourteenth of the month of Rajab, in the year eight hundred and ninety seven (12th May, 1492)."

== See also ==
- Malik Baha-ud-din
- Khudawand Khan
- Malik Sarang Sultani
- Shah e Alam

== Bibliography ==
- Commissariat, M. S. (1938). A History of Gujarat. Vol. I. Ahmadabad: Longmans Green & Co. Ltd.
- Chaube, J. (1975). History of Gujarat Kingdom, 1458-1537. Munshiram Manoharlal Publishers. ISBN 978-0-88386-573-6.
