= Ahirwada =

Historic region of India

Ahirwada was a historic region located between the Parvati and Betwa rivers in Central India or modern Madhya Pradesh. It was between the cities Bhilsa and Jhansi. Historically Ahirwada was ruled by members of the Ahir community.

The name Ahirwada is derived from Ahir and wada Literary meaning the abode of the Ahirs,

== History ==
The Abhiras are often mentioned in Ksatrapa inscriptions of Saurashtra. The Puranas and the Brihatsamhita place the Abhiras in the southern region during the Samudragupta. These tribes slowly spread out in different parts of India. They may have occupied Ahirwada in Madhya Pradesh at a late date. We know of their occupation in Rajasthan also at a late date as is evident from the Jodhpur inscription of samwat 918, that the Abhira people of this area were a terror to their neighbours, because of their violent demeanour.

It was under Khichi dynasty which rose during the time of mughal emperor Akbar. During reign of Aurangzeb, ruler was Raja Dhiraj Singh of Khichi dynasty, who for most of the time remained busy in putting down the Ahir rebellion and restoring order.

== Puranmal ==
Puranmal was an Ahir/Yadav King in the Malwa region roughly what is now called the Ahirwada during 1714-1716 (A.D.). Jai Singh was appointed as the viceroy of Malwa by Mughal Emperor Farrukhsiyar.

In 1714, Raja Jai Singh II of Jaipur succeeded in suppressing the disorder in Malwa. The Afgan marauders established control over Sironj with the help of Ahir leader Puranmal. The Ahir country (Ahirwada) stood rebellion under its leader Puranmal, who closed the roads from Sironj to Kalabagh and from his strongholds of Ranod and Indore continued to trouble the government. Raja Jai Singh reached Sironj and defeated Afgan Army in April 1715. The peace so imposed could last no longer and in November 1715, Puranmal Ahir renewed his depredations in Malpur. The Rohilas, Girasias, Bhils, Ahirs and other Hindu princelings rose up in all the sides in Malwa. None of the efforts made by government could control the situation.

== Rulers ==
- Puranmal Ahir of the Yaduvanshi Clan.
- Raja Dhiraj Singh of Chauhan Khichi Clan.

== See also ==
- Asirgarh Fort
