= Qutub-e-Alam's Mosque =

Former mosque and tomb complex in Ahmedabad, Gujarat, India

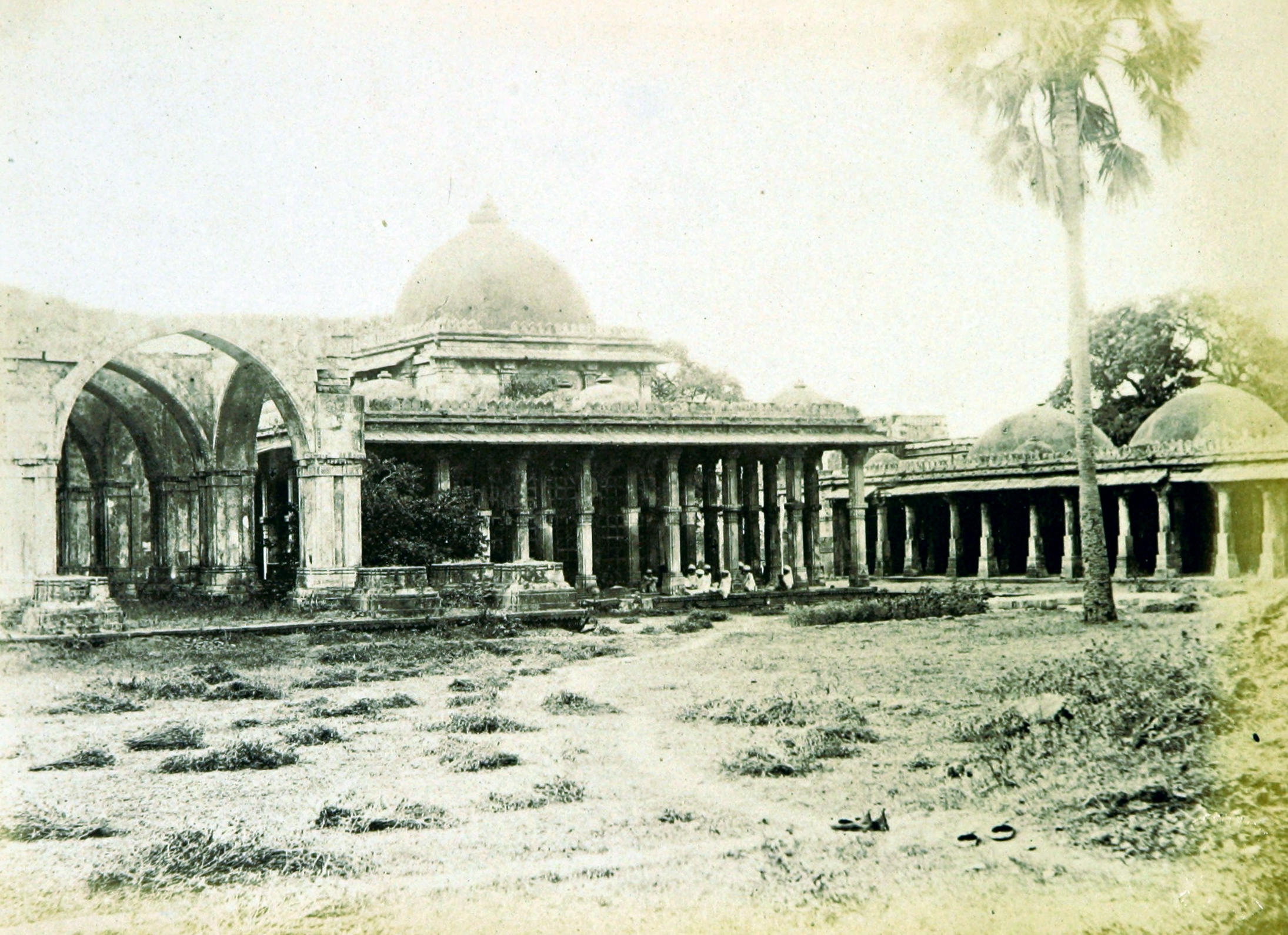
- Qutub-e-Alam's Mosque and Tomb, in 1866

- Location of the former mosque and tomb in Ahmedabad

Religion
- Affiliation: Sufi Islam (former)
- Ecclesiastical or organisational status: Mosque (former); and dargah
- Status: Inactive (partial ruinous state

Location
- Location: Vatva, Ahmedabad, Gujarat
- Country: India
- Coordinates: 22°57′24″N 72°36′49″E

Architecture
- Type: Mosque architecture
- Style: Indo-Islamic; Hindu temple
- Funded by: Mahmud Begada
- Dome: Two (maybe more)

Monument of National Importance
- Official name: Qutub-e-Alam's Mosque and Tomb
- Reference no.: N-GJ-47

Qutub-e-Alam's Mosque, or more correctly, Qutub-e-Alam's Mosque and Tomb, also known as Vatva Dargah, is a former Sufi mosque and dargah complex in the Vatva area of Ahmedabad, in the state of Gujarat, India. The structure is a Monument of National Importance.

== History ==
Abu Muhammad abd Allah b. Nasir al-din Mahmud (or Muhammad) b. jalal al-din Makhdum-i jahaniyan aka Kutb-i Alam aka Thani-i Makhdum-i jahaniyan was a Suhrawardī saint and founder of the Bukhari Sayyids of Gujarat. He was the grandson of jalal al-din Makhdum-i jahaniyan and was born in 1388 in UchUch. According to the Mirat-i Ahmadi he became an orphan at the age of ten and was raised by his granduncle Shah Raju Kattal who sent him to Gujarat. In Gujarat he was welcomed by his grandfather's disciple Sultan Muzaffar Shah I. He studied under Mawlana Alishir Gujarati, and after the founding of Ahmadabad he first settled in Asaual and then at Batva. He received a Khirka from Shaykh Ahmad-i Khattu. His most notable disciple was his son Shah Alam.

== Architecture ==
The nobles of the courts of Ahmed Shah, Sultan Qutubuddin Ahmad Shah II raised a small shrine first. Afterwards a mosque, a tomb to one of his sons, a large many-sided pond, and a vast mausoleum was built Mahmud Begada. The mosque and son's tomb are in the flat Hindu temple style, without arches or minarets. But in the large mausoleum, with a great gain in size, the arch takes the place of the beam, and the dome is raised high in air by a second tier of arches. The arch, uniformly used with one consistent design, has much beauty and propriety. The tomb is of the most elaborate workmanship surmounted by a richly inlaid canopy. But although the building is incomplete, it wants the outer aisles and has no stone trellis work in its windows.

== Gallery ==
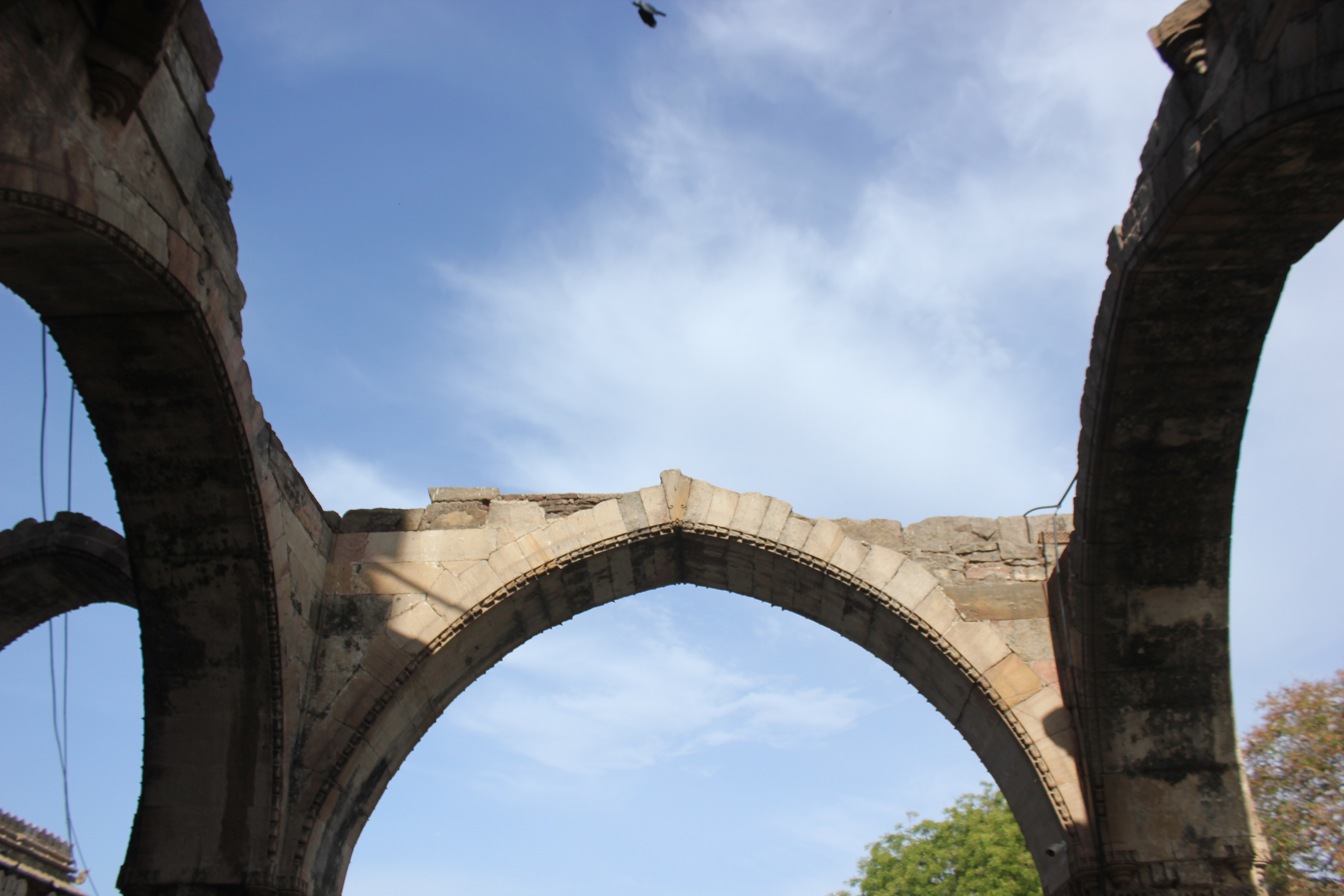
Partial ruins of the arches, in 2016

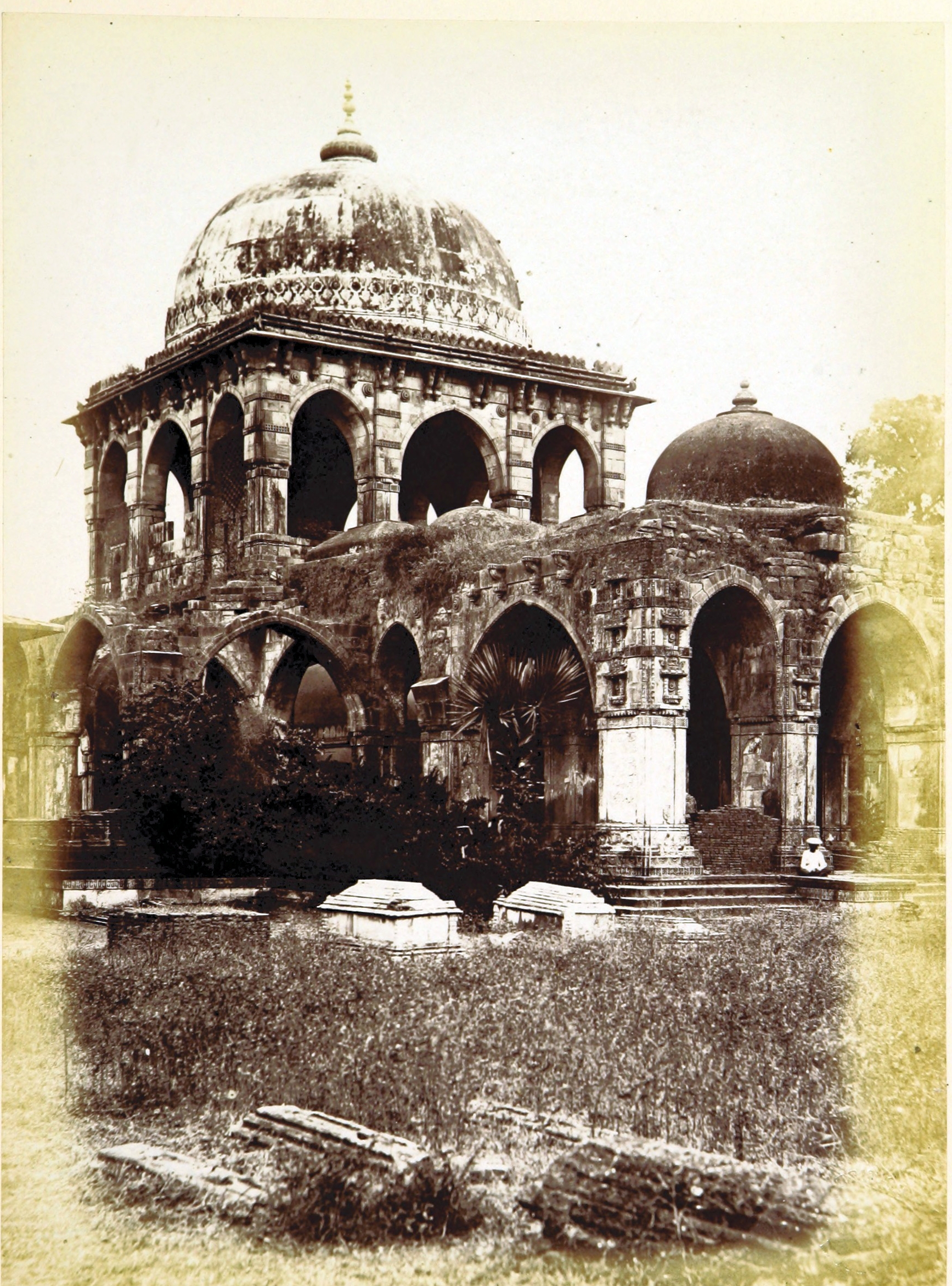
Tomb of Qutub-e-Alam, in 1866

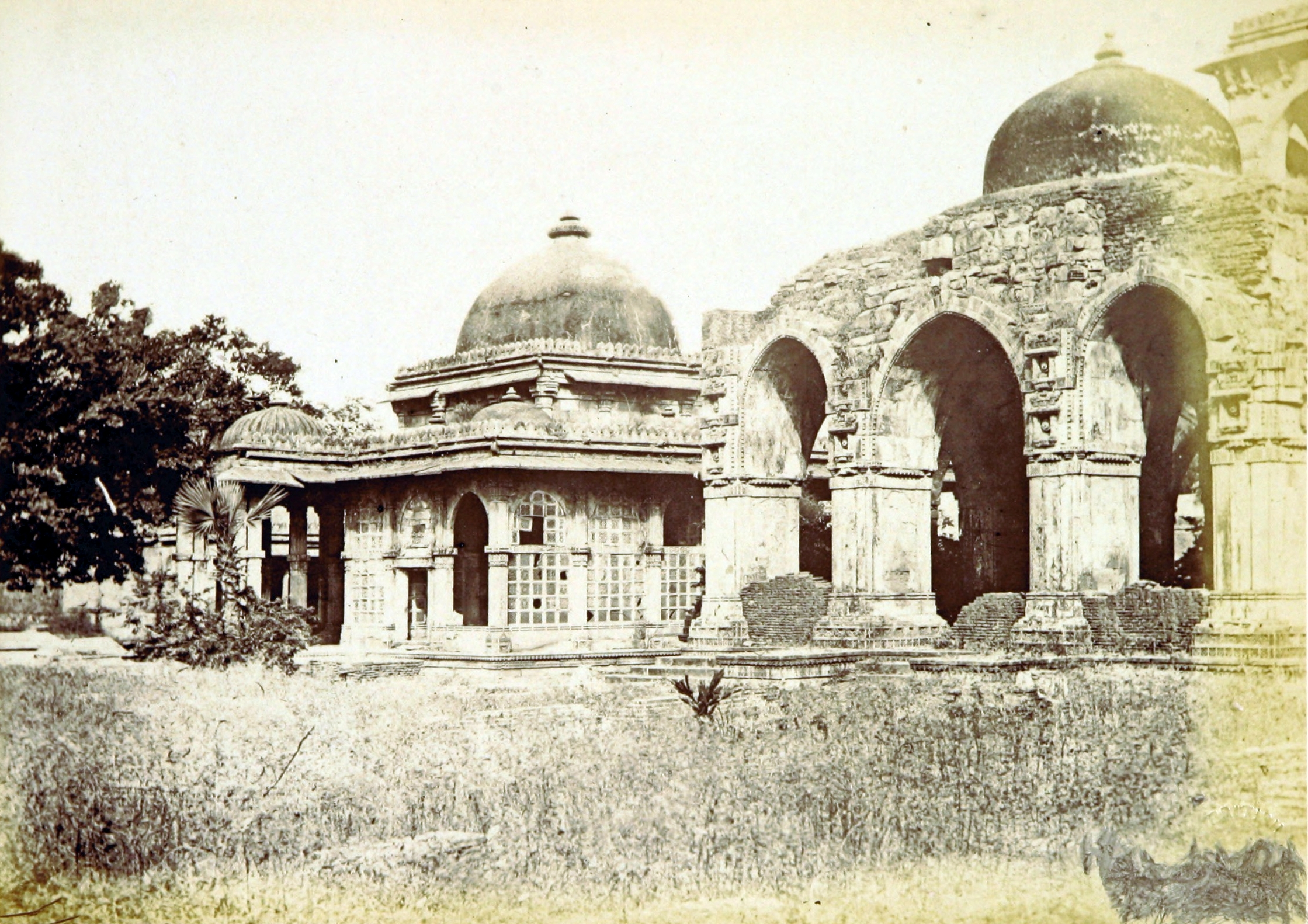
Tomb of Qutub-e-Alam and his sons, in 1866

== See also ==
- Islam in India
- List of mosques in India
- List of Monuments of National Importance in Gujarat
