= Shah e Alam =

Sufi saint

Shahenshah E Gujarat, Hamshabi E Rasool, Mehboob E Baari, Saiyed Muhammad Sirajuddin Shah E Alam Bukhari

Personal life
- Born: 17 Zilqadah 817 Hijri/January 1415 Ad
- Died: 20 Jumada al akhira 880 Hijri/21 October 1475 AD (aged 63)
- Resting place: Shah-e-Alam's Roza
- Flourished: Late 13th century and early 14th century
- Parents: Qutbul Aaftab Saiyed Abdullah Burhanuddin Qutub E Alam (father); Sultana Makhdooma Bibi Aminah Siddiqua (mother)
- Other name: "Shahenshah e Gujarat Shahenshah e Wilayat"

Religious life
- Religion: sunni Islam
- Denomination: specifically the Suhrawardiyya of Sufism

Senior posting
- Based in: Ahmedabad
- Predecessor: Shaikh Ahmed Ganj Bakhsh, Qutub e Alam Syed Burhanuddin Suhrwadiya

Shah-E-Alam, born on 17 Dhul Qidah 817 Hijri/18 January 1415 AD at Patan city in Gujarat, India, is a Muslim religious teacher and great Wali residing in Ahmedabad, Gujarat, India during the Gujarat Sultanante.

== Life ==
Syed Sirajuddin Muhammad, the son and successor of Syed Burhanuddin Qutub-e-Alam, came to be called by the title of Shah-e-Alam, king of the world. His father Sheikh Burhanuddin, also known as Qutub-e-Alam, was the grandson of Syed Makhdoom Jehaniya Jehan Gasht. He arrived in Gujarat during the beginning of the fifteenth century during rule of Ahmed Shah I, settling on the outskirts of Ahmedabad of Gujarat

He died on 20 Jumada al akhira 880 Hijri/1475 AD. The mausoleum was built by Taj Kham Narpali and now known as Shah-e-Alam's Roza.

== See also ==
- Shah-e-Alam's Roza, the mausoleum and the mosque complex dedicated to him
- Qutub-e-Alam's Mosque at Vatva
