= List of Monuments of National Importance in Ahmedabad district =

This is a list of Monuments of National Importance (ASI) as officially recognized by and available through the website of the Archaeological Survey of India in the Indian state Gujarat. The monument identifier is a combination of the abbreviation of the subdivision of the list (state, ASI circle) and the numbering as published on the website of the ASI. 203 Monuments of National Importance have been recognized by the ASI in Gujarat.

== List of monuments of national importance ==
For technical reasons the monuments in Ahmedabad are displayed in a separate list. Please see the Gujarat page for the rest of the monuments in this state.

SL. No.	Description	Location	Address	District	Coordinates	Image
N-GJ-1	Three gates besides Bhadrakali temple (Azam Khan Sarai)	Ahmedabad		Ahmedabad	23°01′26″N 72°34′53″E	Three gates besides Bhadrakali temple (Azam Khan Sarai) More images
N-GJ-2	Bhadra Tower (Bhadra gate)	Ahmedabad		Ahmedabad	23°01′27″N 72°34′53″E	Bhadra Tower (Bhadra gate) More images
N-GJ-3	Sidi Saiyyed Mosque	Ahmedabad		Ahmedabad	23°01′37″N 72°34′52″E	Sidi Saiyyed Mosque More images
N-GJ-4	Ahmed Shah's Mosque	Ahmedabad		Ahmedabad	23°01′22″N 72°34′44″E	Ahmed Shah's Mosque More images
N-GJ-5	Teen Darwaza	Ahmedabad		Ahmedabad	23°01′28″N 72°35′04″E	Teen Darwaza More images
N-GJ-6	Shah Kupai Masjid (Shah Khoob Masjid)	Ahmedabad		Ahmedabad	23°01′26″N 72°35′00″E	Shah Kupai Masjid (Shah Khoob Masjid) More images
N-GJ-7	Jama Masjid, Ahmedabad	Ahmedabad		Ahmedabad	23°01′26″N 72°35′14″E	Jama Masjid, Ahmedabad More images
N-GJ-8	Rani no Hajiro (Tombs of Queens of Ahmed Shah)	Ahmedabad		Ahmedabad	23°01′25″N 72°35′21″E	Rani no Hajiro (Tombs of Queens of Ahmed Shah) More images
N-GJ-9	Ahmed Shah's Tomb (Badshah no Hajiro)	Ahmedabad		Ahmedabad	23°01′26″N 72°35′17″E	Ahmed Shah's Tomb (Badshah no Hajiro) More images
N-GJ-10	Panchkuwa gate	Ahmedabad		Ahmedabad	23°01′30″N 72°35′50″E	Panchkuwa gate More images
N-GJ-11	Queen's Mosque in Sarangpur	Ahmedabad		Ahmedabad	23°01′22″N 72°35′45″E	Queen's Mosque in Sarangpur More images
N-GJ-12	Tomb near Queen's Mosque, Sarangpur	Ahmedabad		Ahmedabad	23°01′22″N 72°35′46″E	Upload Photo
N-GJ-13	Brick Minars	Ahmedabad		Ahmedabad	23°01′41″N 72°36′04″E	Brick Minars More images
N-GJ-14	Sidi Bashir Mosque - (Jhulta Minar)	Ahmedabad		Ahmedabad	23°01′25″N 72°35′59″E	Sidi Bashir Mosque - (Jhulta Minar) More images
N-GJ-15	Delhi gate	Ahmedabad		Ahmedabad	23°02′16″N 72°35′17″E	Delhi gate More images
N-GJ-16	Qutub Shah's Mosque	Ahmedabad		Ahmedabad	23°02′07″N 72°35′15″E	Qutub Shah's Mosque More images
N-GJ-17	Hazrat Harir's Mosque & Tomb	Ahmedabad	Asarwa	Ahmedabad	23°02′27″N 72°36′17″E	Hazrat Harir's Mosque & Tomb More images
N-GJ-18	Dada Harir Stepwell	Ahmedabad	Asarwa	Ahmedabad	23°02′27″N 72°36′19″E	Dada Harir Stepwell More images
N-GJ-19	Kalulpur gate	Ahmedabad		Ahmedabad	23°01′51″N 72°35′53″E	Kalulpur gate More images
N-GJ-20	Sarangpur Gate	Ahmedabad		Ahmedabad	23°01′21″N 72°35′53″E	Sarangpur Gate More images
N-GJ-21	Dariyapur gate	Ahmedabad		Ahmedabad	23°02′15″N 72°35′35″E	Dariyapur gate More images
N-GJ-22	Premabhai gate	Ahmedabad		Ahmedabad	23°02′06″N 72°35′48″E	Premabhai gate More images
N-GJ-23	Mata Bhavani's Stepwell	Ahmedabad	Asarwa	Ahmedabad	23°02′40″N 72°36′25″E	Mata Bhavani's Stepwell More images
N-GJ-24	Achut Bibi's Mosque	Ahmedabad	Kazipur-Dariyapur	Ahmedabad	23°02′52″N 72°34′53″E	Achut Bibi's Mosque More images
N-GJ-25	Dariya Khan's Tomb	Ahmedabad	Dudheshwar	Ahmedabad	23°03′10″N 72°35′13″E	Dariya Khan's Tomb More images
N-GJ-26	Muhafiz Khan Mosque	Ahmedabad		Ahmedabad	23°01′59″N 72°35′17″E	Muhafiz Khan Mosque More images
N-GJ-27	Rani Rupamati's Mosque	Ahmedabad		Ahmedabad	23°01′54″N 72°35′01″E	Rani Rupamati's Mosque More images
N-GJ-28	Shahpur Kazi Mohmad Chisti's Masjid	Ahmedabad		Ahmedabad	23°02′16″N 72°34′50″E	Shahpur Kazi Mohmad Chisti's Masjid More images
N-GJ-29	Saiyad Usman Mosque and Tomb	Ahmedabad	Usmanpura	Ahmedabad	23°02′53″N 72°34′10″E	Saiyad Usman Mosque and Tomb More images
N-GJ-30	Shah-e-Alam's Roza	Ahmedabad	Shah Alam	Ahmedabad	22°59′40″N 72°35′22″E	Shah-e-Alam's Roza More images
N-GJ-31	Small stone Mosque (Rani Masjid)	Ahmedabad	Paldi	Ahmedabad	23°00′37″N 72°33′54″E	Upload Photo
N-GJ-32	Azam and Mauzzam Khan's Tomb	Ahmedabad	Vasna	Ahmedabad	23°00′07″N 72°32′59″E	Azam and Mauzzam Khan's Tomb More images
N-GJ-33	Dastur Khan's Mosque	Ahmedabad		Ahmedabad	23°01′04″N 72°35′21″E	Dastur Khan's Mosque More images
N-GJ-34	Rani Sipri's Mosque and Tomb	Ahmedabad		Ahmedabad	23°01′02″N 72°35′25″E	Rani Sipri's Mosque and Tomb More images
N-GJ-35	Astodiya gate	Ahmedabad		Ahmedabad	23°01′01″N 72°35′27″E	Astodiya gate More images
N-GJ-36	Malik Alam's Mosque	Ahmedabad	Danilimbda	Ahmedabad	23°00′03″N 72°35′13″E	Malik Alam's Mosque More images
N-GJ-37	Raipur gate	Ahmedabad		Ahmedabad	23°01′02″N 72°35′41″E	Raipur gate More images
N-GJ-38	Inlet to Kankaria Lake	Ahmedabad	Kankaria	Ahmedabad	23°00′22″N 72°36′15″E	Inlet to Kankaria Lake More images
N-GJ-39	Bibiji's Masjid	Ahmedabad	Gomtipur	Ahmedabad	23°00′52″N 72°36′51″E	Bibiji's Masjid More images
N-GJ-40	Haibat Khan's Mosque	Ahmedabad		Ahmedabad	23°00′45″N 72°34′56″E	Haibat Khan's Mosque More images
N-GJ-41	Baba Lului's Mosque	Ahmedabad	Behrampura	Ahmedabad	23°00′32″N 72°34′33″E	Baba Lului's Mosque More images
N-GJ-42	Nawab Sardar Khan Masjid and outer gate in survey No. 6814. (part of Sardar Khan's Roza)	Ahmedabad		Ahmedabad	23°00′56″N 72°35′02″E	Nawab Sardar Khan Masjid and outer gate in survey No. 6814. (part of Sardar Khan's Roza) More images
N-GJ-43	Sardar Khan's Roza and its compound bearing C.S.No. 6811	Ahmedabad		Ahmedabad	23°00′56″N 72°35′03″E	Sardar Khan's Roza and its compound bearing C.S.No. 6811 More images
N-GJ-44	Mir Abu Turab's Tomb	Ahmedabad	Behrampura	Ahmedabad	23°00′17″N 72°34′36″E	Mir Abu Turab's Tomb More images
N-GJ-45	Jethabhai's Stepwell	Isanpur		Ahmedabad	22°58′28″N 72°36′12″E	Jethabhai's Stepwell More images
N-GJ-46	Small Stone Masjid (Gumle Masjid) (Malik Isan's Mosque)	Isanpur		Ahmedabad	22°58′45″N 72°35′57″E	Upload Photo
N-GJ-47	Qutub-e-Alam's Mosque	Vatva		Ahmedabad	22°57′24″N 72°36′49″E	Qutub-e-Alam's Mosque More images
N-GJ-48	Great Mosque	Sarkhej Roza		Ahmedabad	22°59′36″N 72°30′17″E	Great Mosque More images
N-GJ-49	Great Tank, Palace & Harem	Sarkhej Roza		Ahmedabad	22°59′27″N 72°30′15″E	Great Tank, Palace & Harem More images
N-GJ-50	Pavilion	Sarkhej Roza		Ahmedabad	22°59′36″N 72°30′20″E	Pavilion More images
N-GJ-51	Roza of Baba Ishaq and Bawa Ganj Bhaksh	Sarkhej Roza		Ahmedabad	22°59′17″N 72°30′12″E	Upload Photo
N-GJ-52	Tomb of Bibi (Rani) Rajbai	Sarkhej Roza		Ahmedabad	22°59′35″N 72°30′19″E	Tomb of Bibi (Rani) Rajbai More images
N-GJ-53	Tomb of Mahmud Begada	Sarkhej Roza		Ahmedabad	22°59′35″N 72°30′21″E	Tomb of Mahmud Begada More images
N-GJ-54	Tomb of Shaikh Ahmed Khattau Ganj Baksh	Sarkhej Roza		Ahmedabad	22°59′37″N 72°30′20″E	Tomb of Shaikh Ahmed Khattau Ganj Baksh More images
N-GJ-55	Jami Masjid	Dholka		Ahmedabad	22°43′46″N 72°26′27″E	Jami Masjid More images
N-GJ-56	Malav Tank	Dholka		Ahmedabad	22°43′36″N 72°26′07″E	Malav Tank More images
N-GJ-57	Khan Masjid	Dholka		Ahmedabad	22°44′02″N 72°25′53″E	Khan Masjid More images
N-GJ-58	Bahlol Khan Gazi's Mosque	Dholka		Ahmedabad	22°44′04″N 72°26′28″E	Bahlol Khan Gazi's Mosque More images
N-GJ-59	Ruined Building	Dholka		Ahmedabad	22°43′32″N 72°26′31″E	Upload Photo
N-GJ-60	Ancient site at Lothal	Lothal		Ahmedabad	22°31′21″N 72°14′56″E	Ancient site at Lothal More images
N-GJ-61	Masjid of Ragusha Pir	Ranpur		Botad	22°20′48″N 71°42′42″E	Upload Photo
N-GJ-62	Jami Masjid	Mandal		Ahmedabad	23°17′20″N 71°55′01″E	Jami Masjid More images
N-GJ-63	Kazi Masjid	Mandal		Ahmedabad	23°17′24″N 71°55′04″E	Kazi Masjid More images
N-GJ-64	Saiyad Masjid	Mandal		Ahmedabad	23°17′20″N 71°55′03″E	Upload Photo
N-GJ-65	Munsar Talav & Shrines	Viramgam		Ahmedabad	23°07′17″N 72°02′38″E	Munsar Talav & Shrines More images

== See also ==
- List of Monuments of National Importance in India for other Monuments of National Importance in India
- List of State Protected Monuments in Gujarat
