= Muhafiz Khan Mosque =

Mosque in Ahmedabad, Gujarat, India

Muhafiz Khan's Mosque
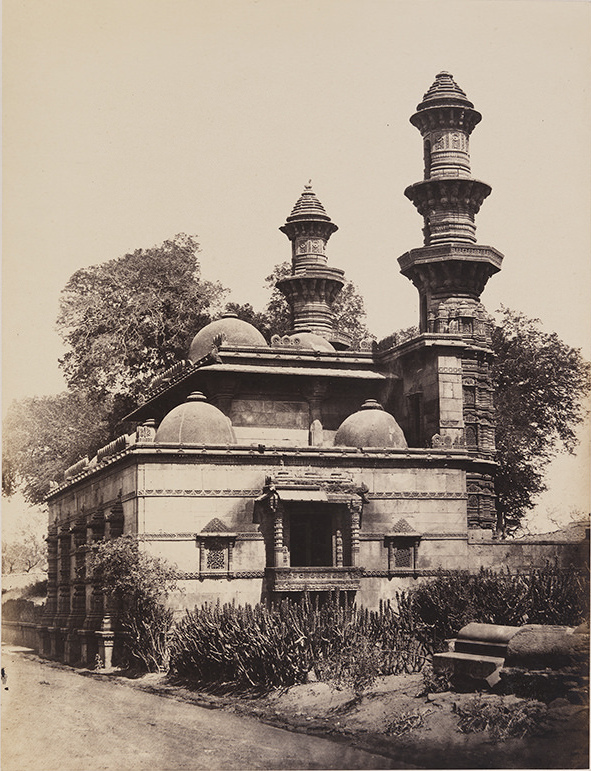
- Muhafiz Khan's Mosque, 1855

- Location in Ahmedabad

Religion
- Affiliation: Islam
- Ecclesiastical or organizational status: Mosque
- Status: Active

Location
- Location: Ahmedabad, Gujarat
- Interactive map of Muhafiz Khan's Mosque
- Coordinates: 23°01′04″N 72°35′21″E

Architecture
- Type: Mosque architecture
- Style: Indo-Islamic; Mughal architecture
- Founder: Jamal-ud-din Muhafiz Khan
- Completed: 1465

Specifications
- Length: 16 m (51 ft)
- Width: 11 m (36 ft)
- Minaret: Two
- Minaret height: 15 m (50 ft)

Monument of National Importance
- Official name: Muhafiz Khan Mosque
- Reference no.: N-GJ-26

The Muhafiz Khan Mosque is a fifteenth-century mosque located in the city of Ahmedabad in the state of Gujarat, India. It is considered to be one of the more exceptional structures in the city. The mosque was constructed in 1465 by Jamail-ud-Din Muhafiz Khan during the reign of Mahmud Shah I (1458–1511), and is considered to be an excellent example of Gujarat Sultanat architecture. It is named for the governor of the region at that time.

The mosque is a protected building, listed as a Monument of National Importance.

== Architecture ==
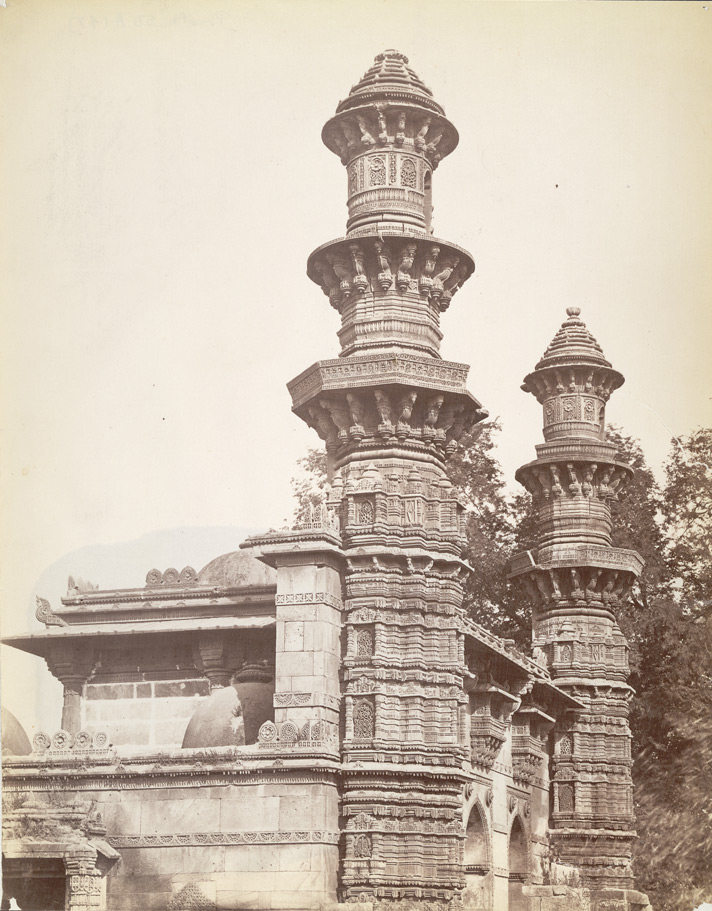
The mosque in c. 1880

The façade of the mosque has three arched entrances and a richly carved minaret at either end. The design has similarities with the Isanpur Mosque and introduced a new architectural style to Ahmedabad. It measures 16 by 11 metres (51 by 36 ft). The minarets stand 15 metres (50 ft) high. Alexander Forbes had replicas of the mosque made from wood and returned to England c. 1880 – c. 1885, and they are now part of the Victoria and Albert Museum permanent collection in London.

During the communal violence in 2002, the mosque was extensively damaged. Afzal Khan said that rioters damaged intricate carvings on the southern elevations of the building and that the damage to be irreparable. This damage has caused upset among India's Muslim population. The restoration of shrines and mosques was debated extensively in parliament. The Indian History Congress(IHC) requested that the Archaeological Survey of India restore and rebuild all religious structures. Ramakrishna Chatterjee, stated to the IHC that the mosques of Muhafiz Khan, the tomb of Wali Mohammed Wali, and the Mosque of Malik Asin were damaged or destroyed. By 2006 restoration work was completed and the mosque reopened to the public.

== Gallery ==
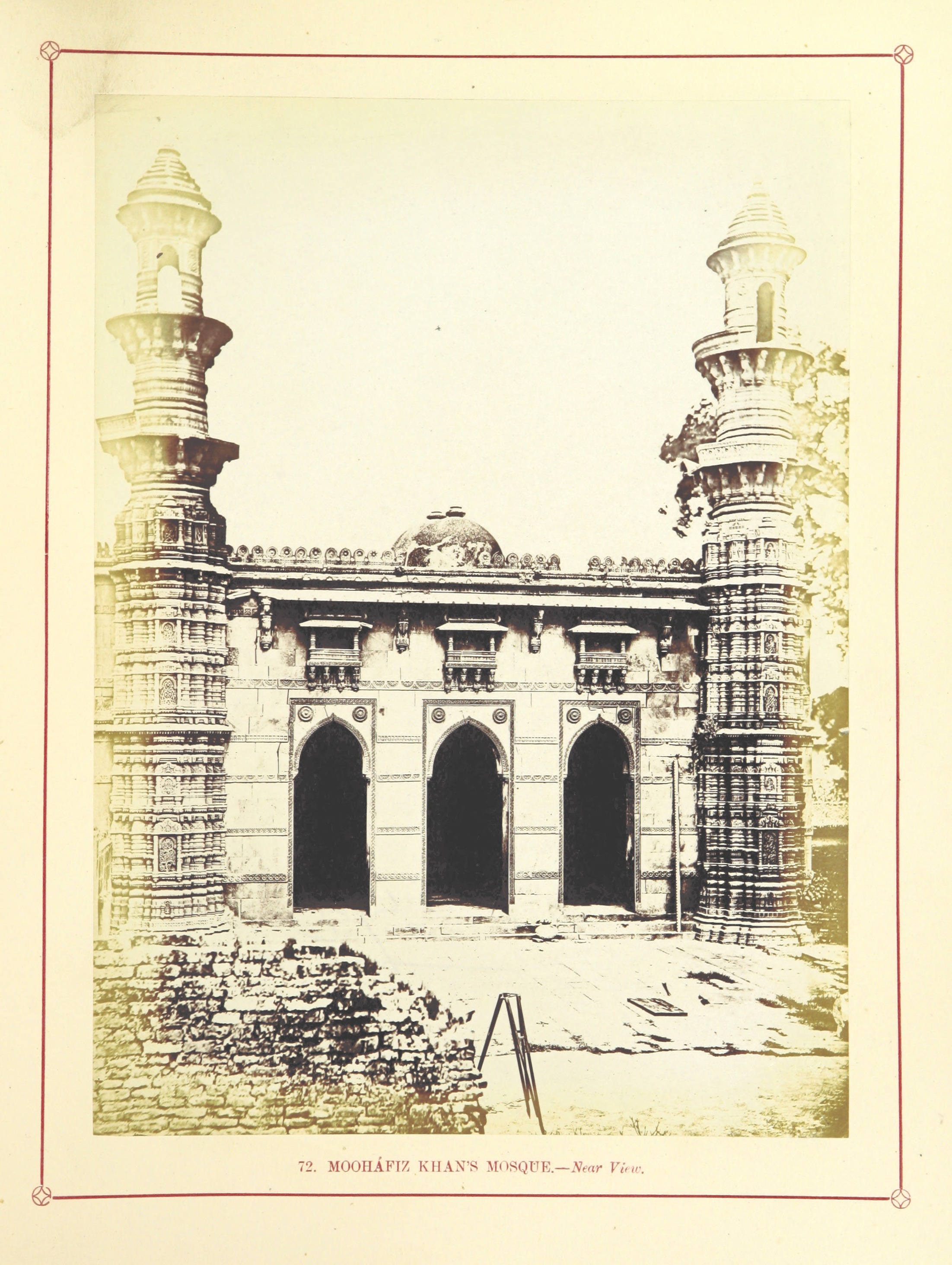
Near view, 1866

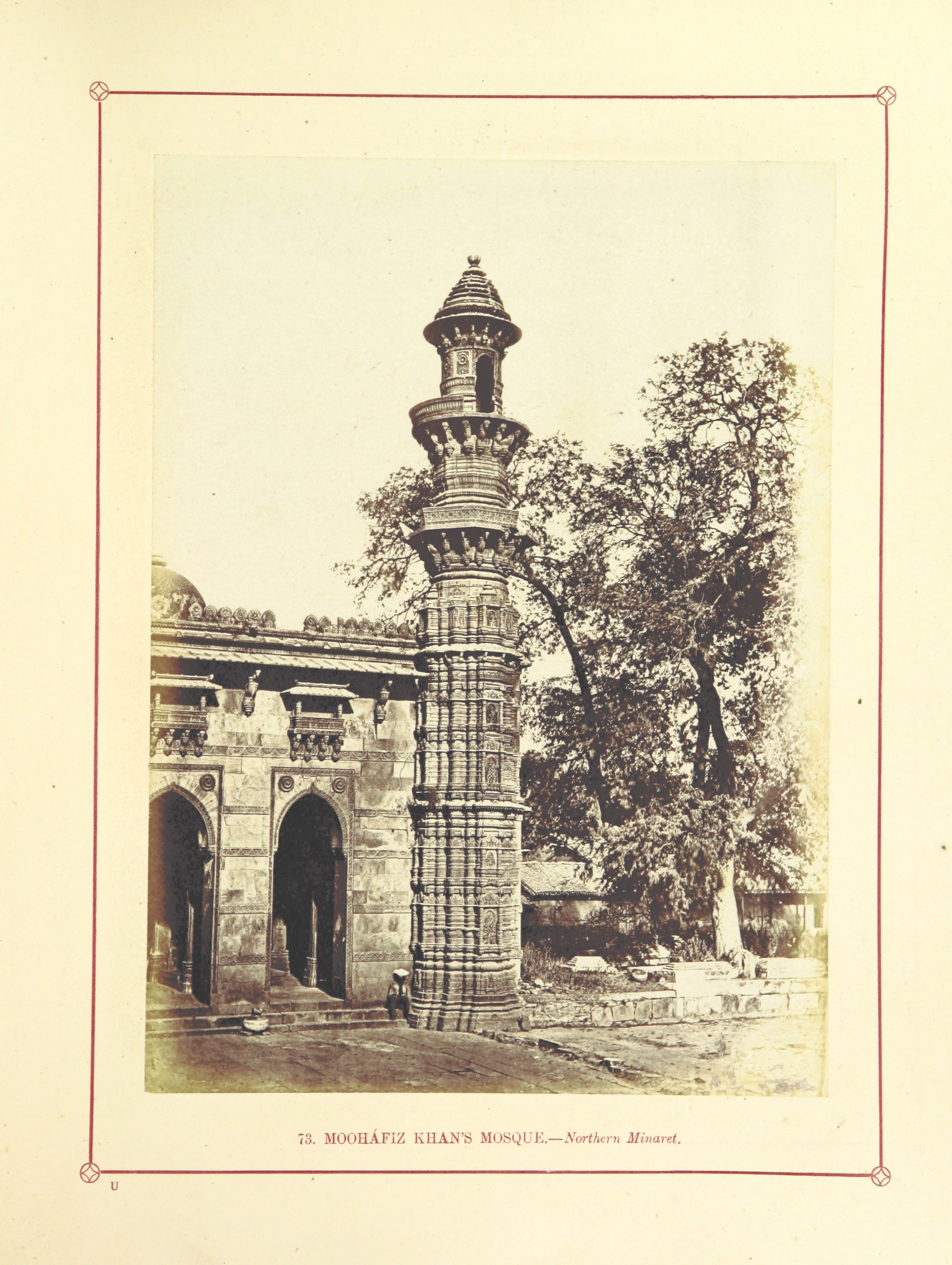
North minaret, 1866

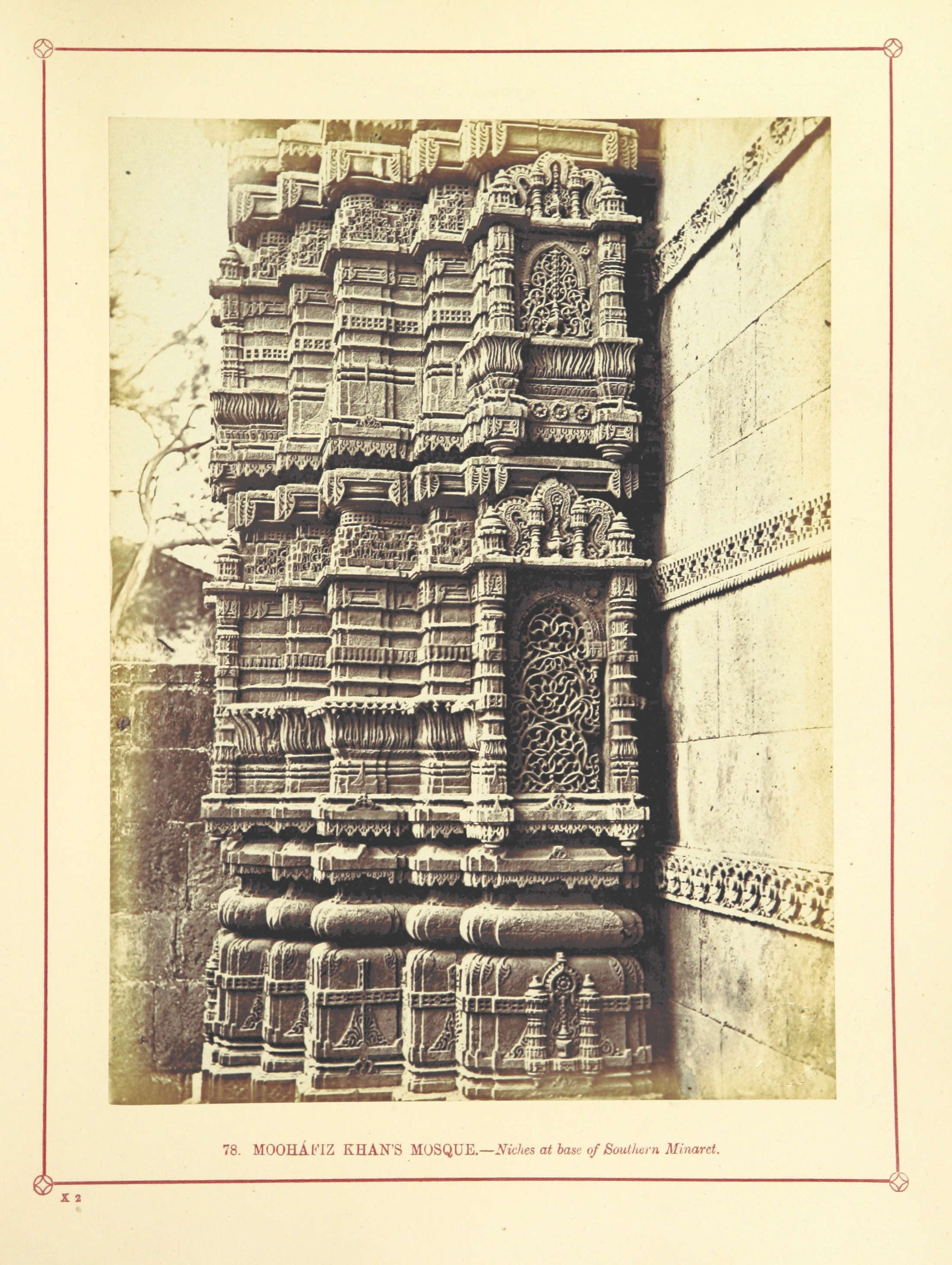
Niche of the southern minaret, 1866

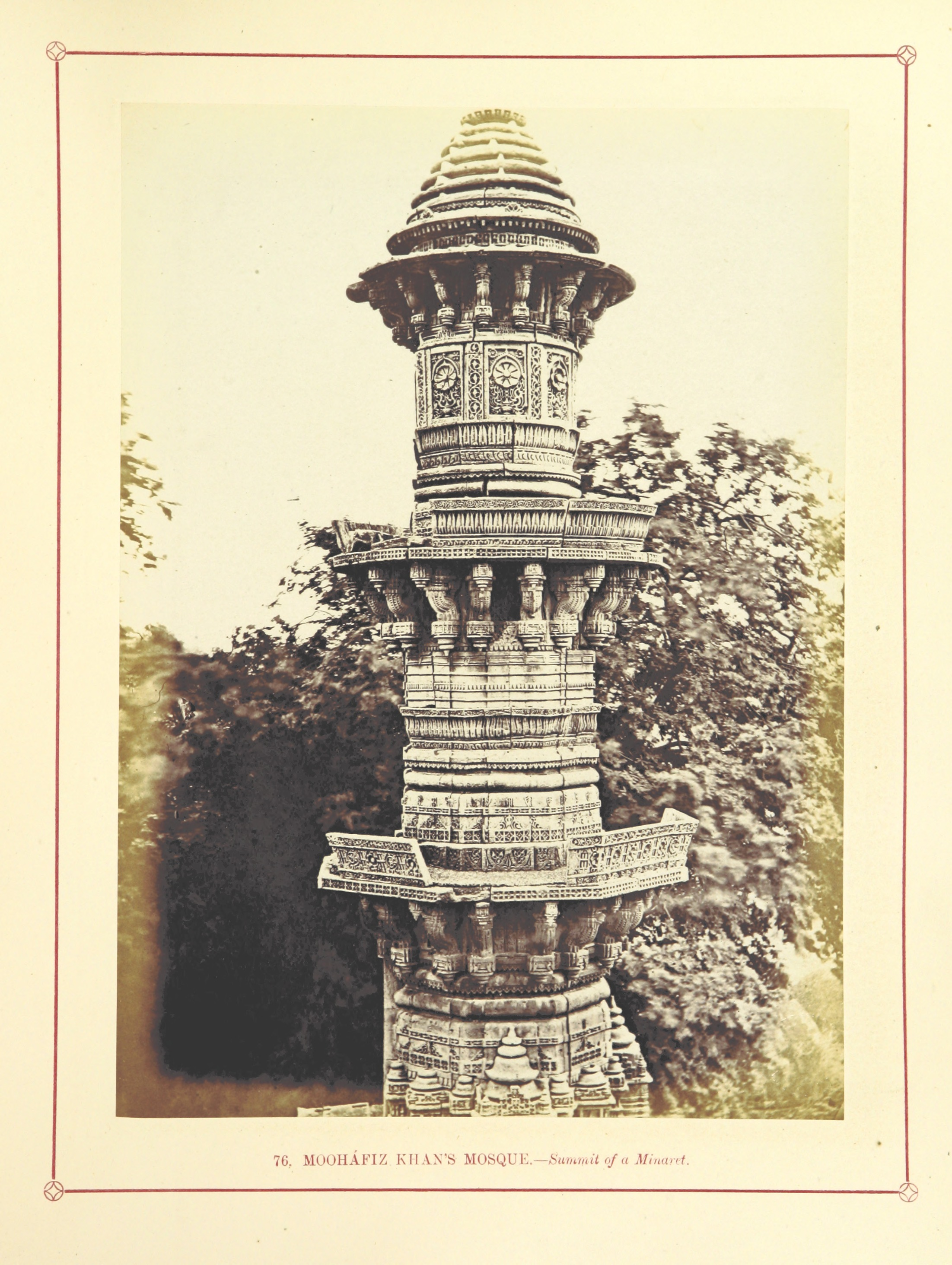
Summit of a minaret, 1866

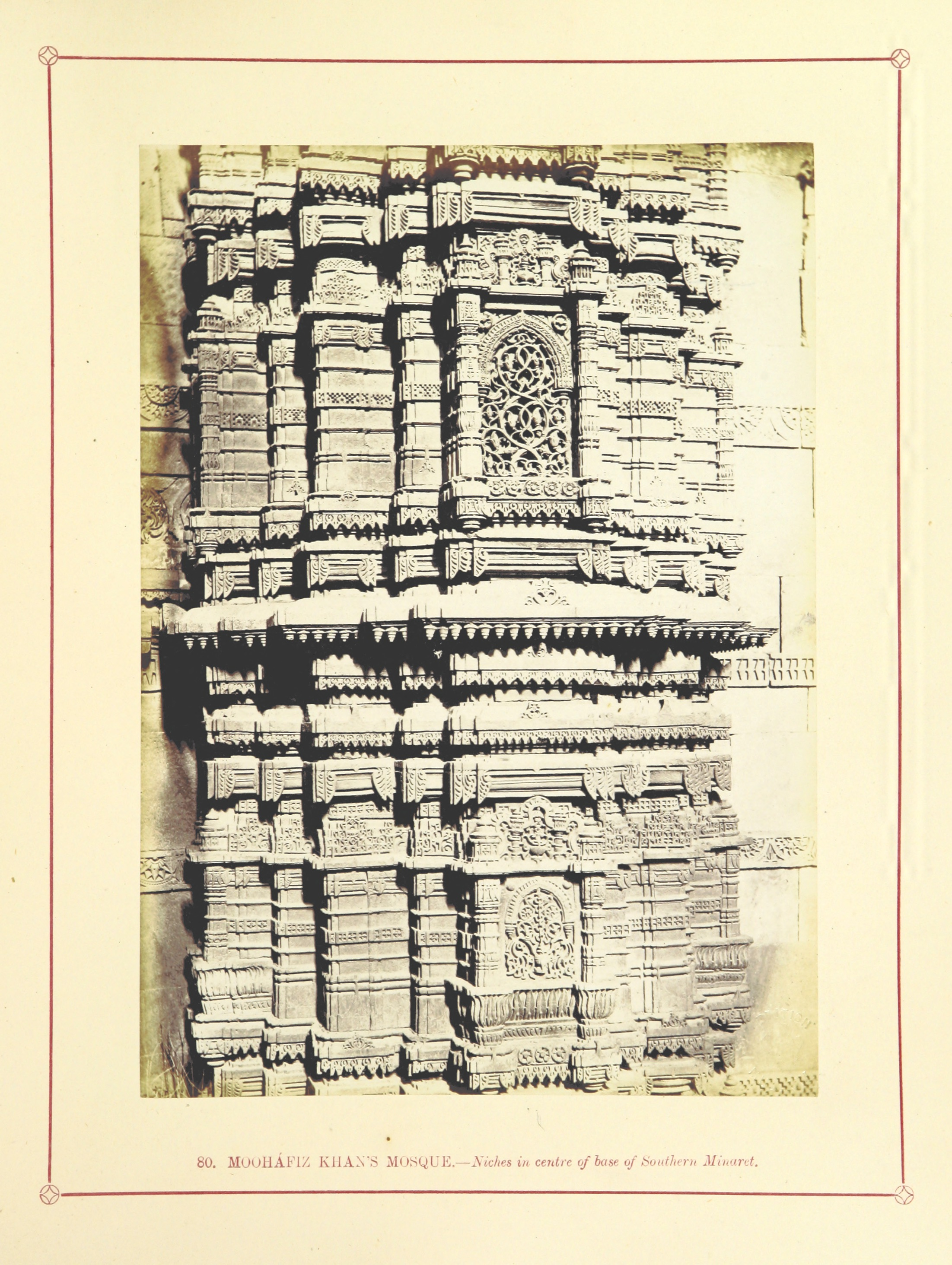
Niche in centre of the base of southern minaret, 1866

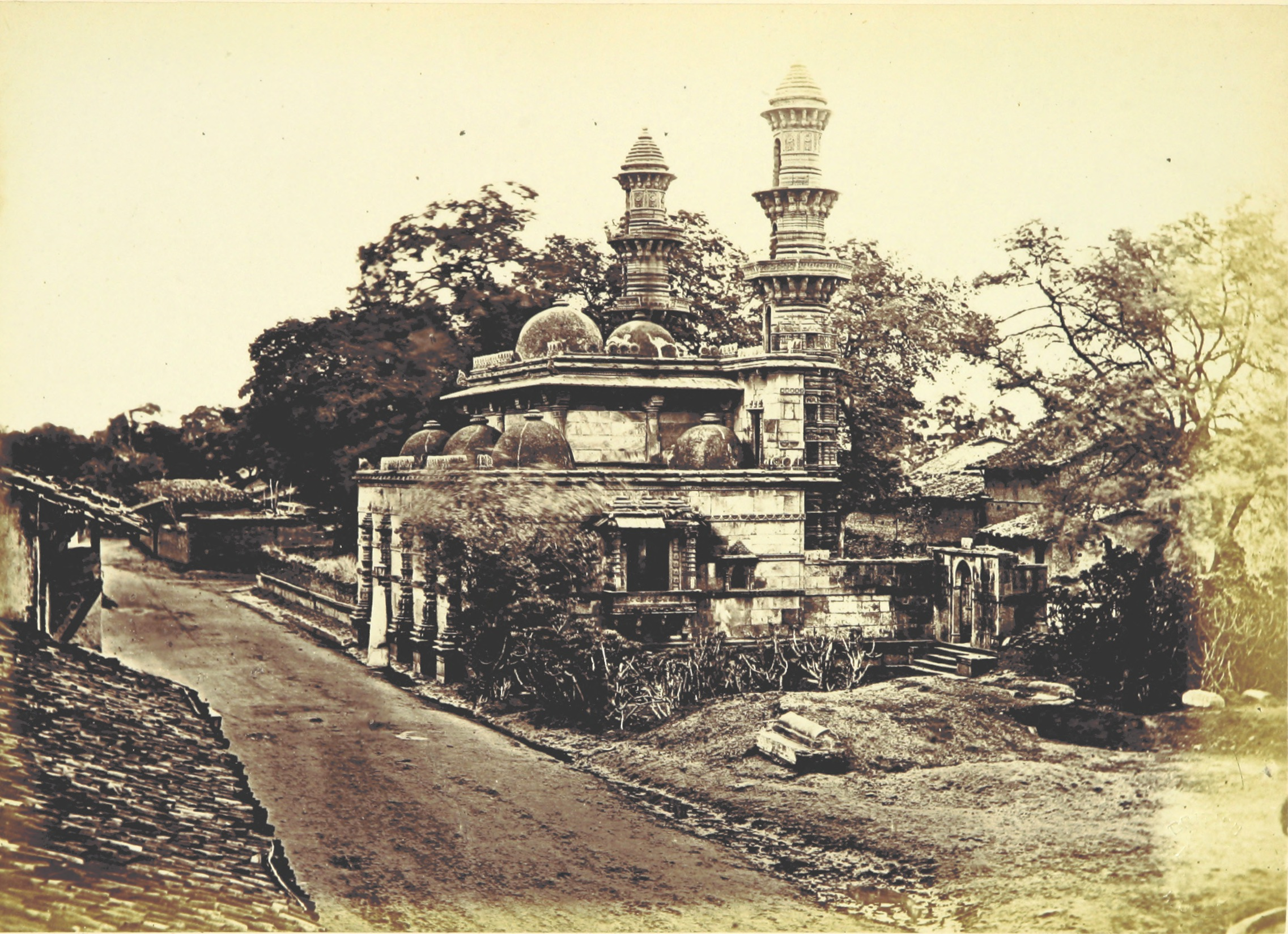
Mosque from distance, 1866

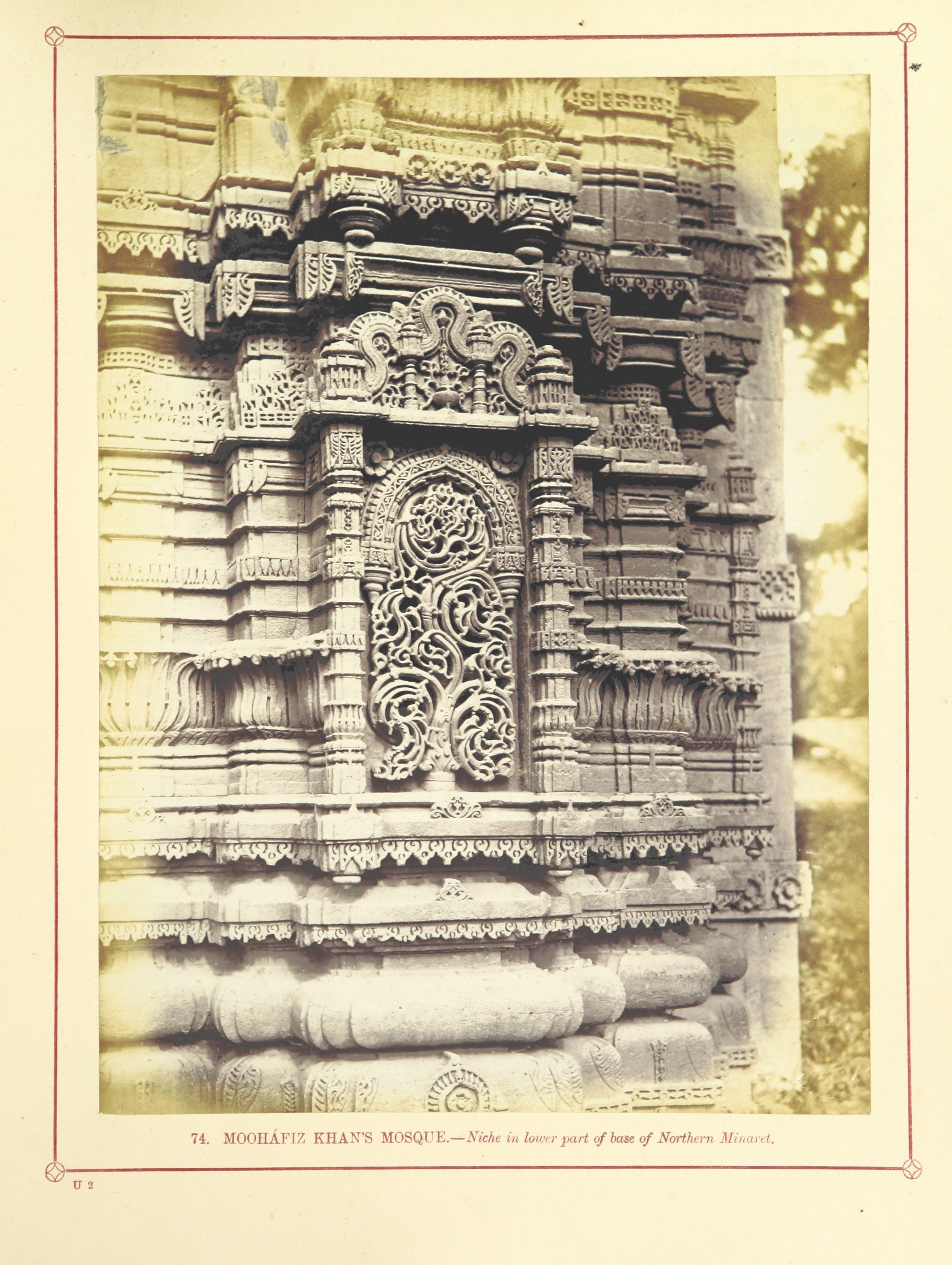
Niche of the lower part of the southern minaret, 1866

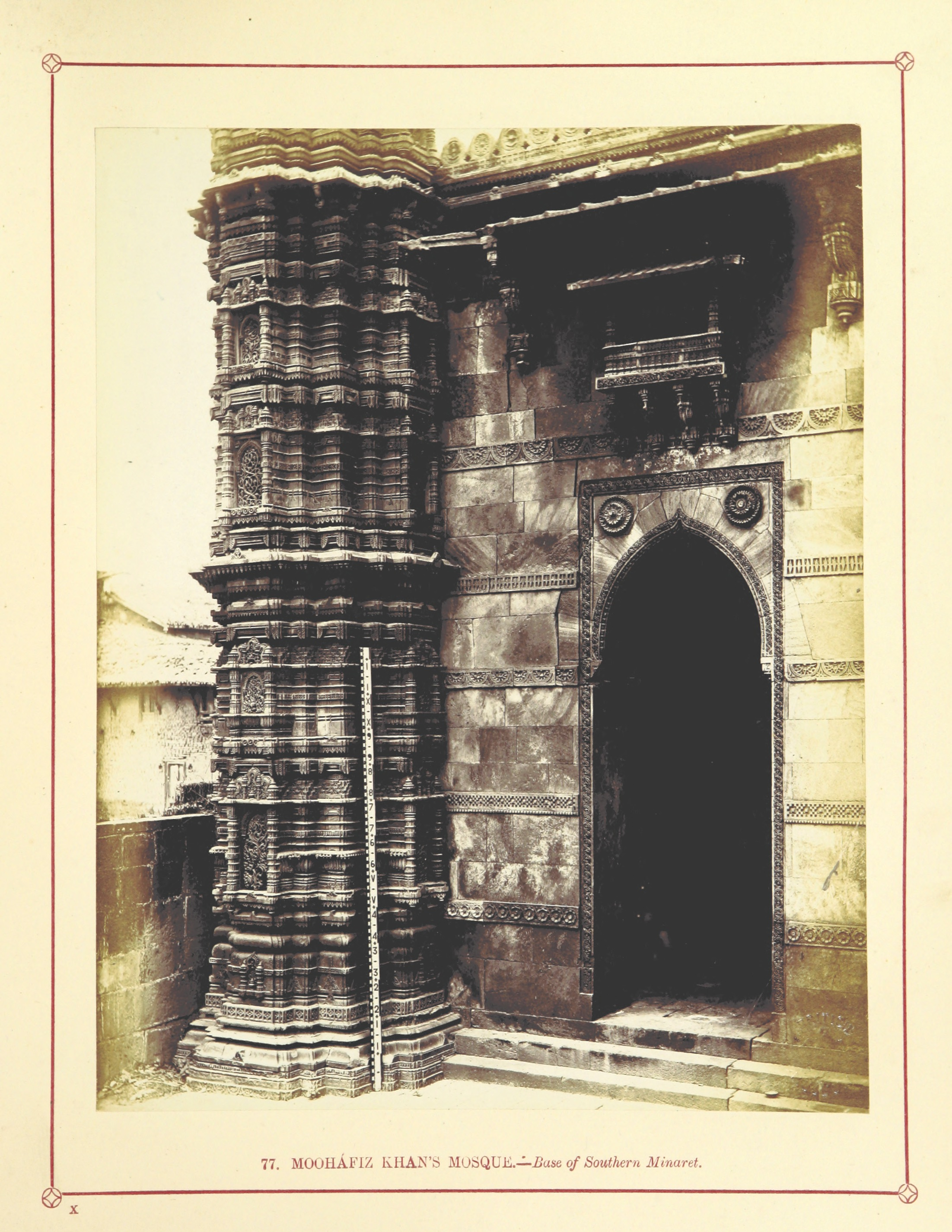
Base of south minaret, 1866

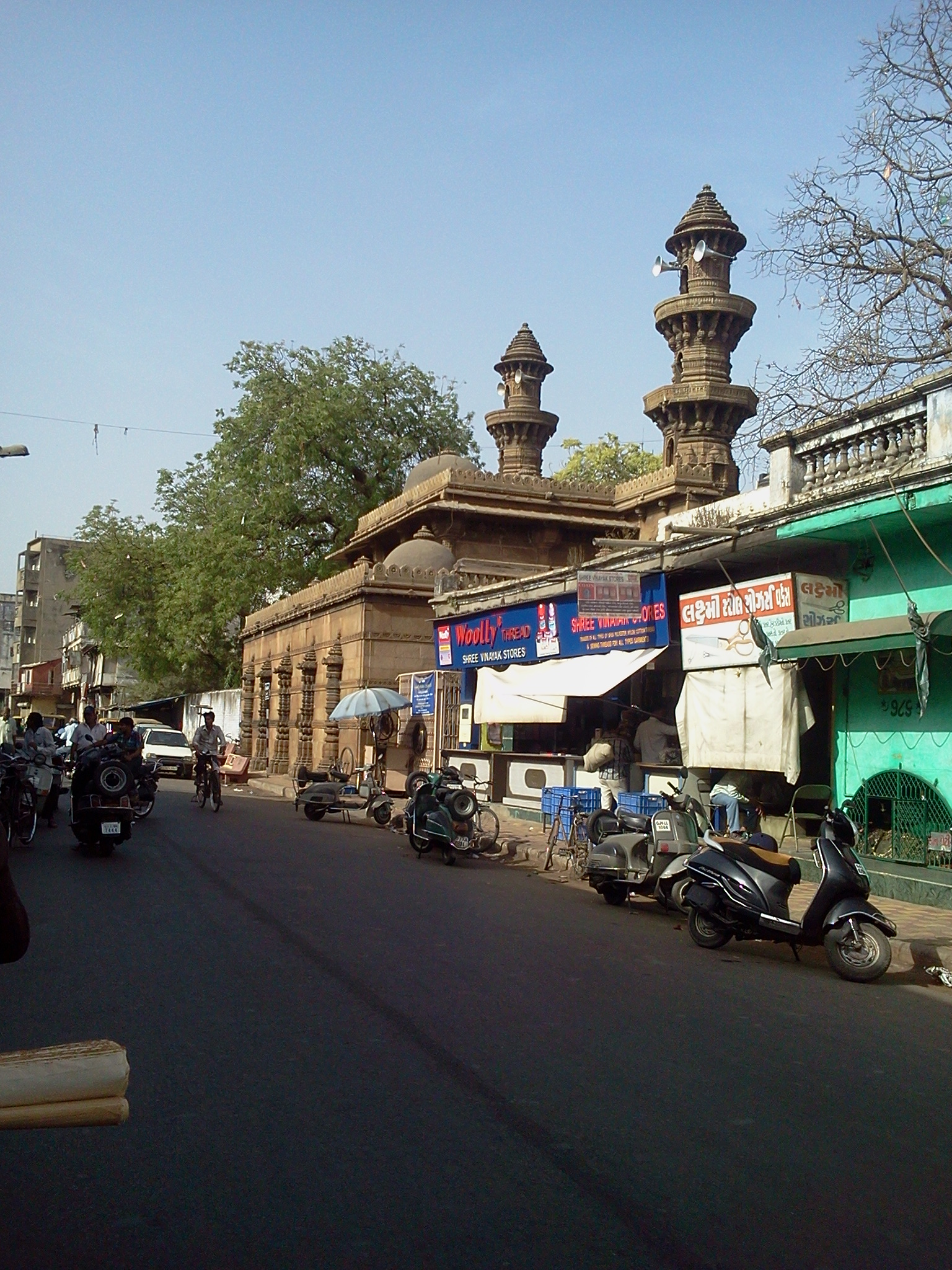
Street scene with the mosque, 2012

== See also ==
- Islam in India
- List of mosques in India
- List of Monuments of National Importance in Ahmedabad district
