= Haibat Khan's Mosque =

Mosque in Ahmedabad, Gujarat, India

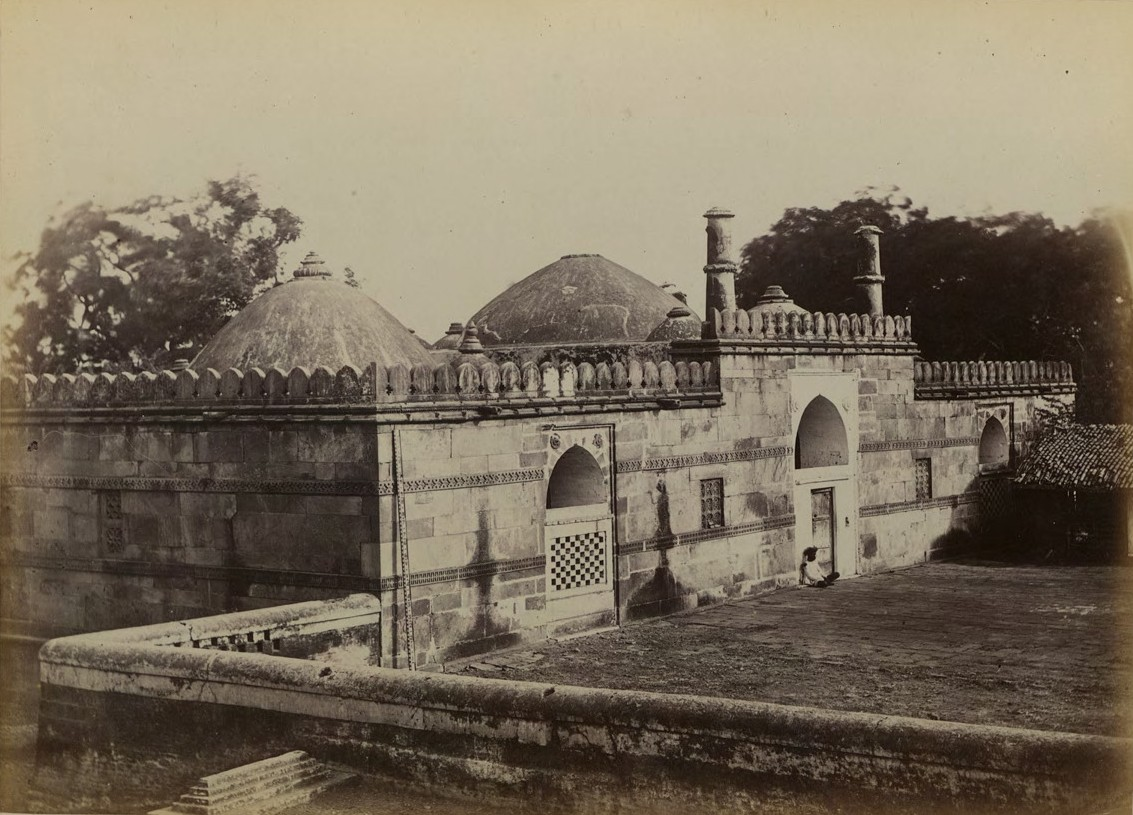
- Haibat Khan's Mosque, 1866

- Location in Ahmedabad

Religion
- Affiliation: Islam
- Ecclesiastical or organizational status: Mosque
- Status: Active

Location
- Location: Ahmedabad, Gujarat
- Country: India
- Interactive map of Haibat Khan's Mosque
- Coordinates: 23°00′50″N 72°35′02″E

Architecture
- Type: Mosque architecture
- Style: Indo-Islamic; Hindu temple
- Founder: Haibat Khan

Specifications
- Dome: Three (maybe more)
- Minaret: Two

Monument of National Importance
- Official name: Haibat Khan's Mosque
- Reference no.: N-GJ-40

Haibat Khan's Mosque is a mosque in Ahmedabad, in the state of Gujarat, India. The structure is a Monument of National Importance.

== History ==
The mosque is located to south-west of Dastur Khan's Mosque near the Jamalpur gate. It was built by Haibat Khan (also known as Masti Khan), one of Ahmed Shah I's nobles and paternal uncle, in 1412 AD.

== Architecture ==
Though of little beauty, the mosque is one of the earliest attempts to combine Indo-Islamic architecture. The front wall is plain, pierced by three small pointed arches; the minarets, small and without ornament, rise from the roof; and, with a dwarfed and unlighted clerestory, the centre is barely raised above the side domes. Inside, in the centre, is a dome with beautiful carvings with variety of rich ornament.

== Gallery ==
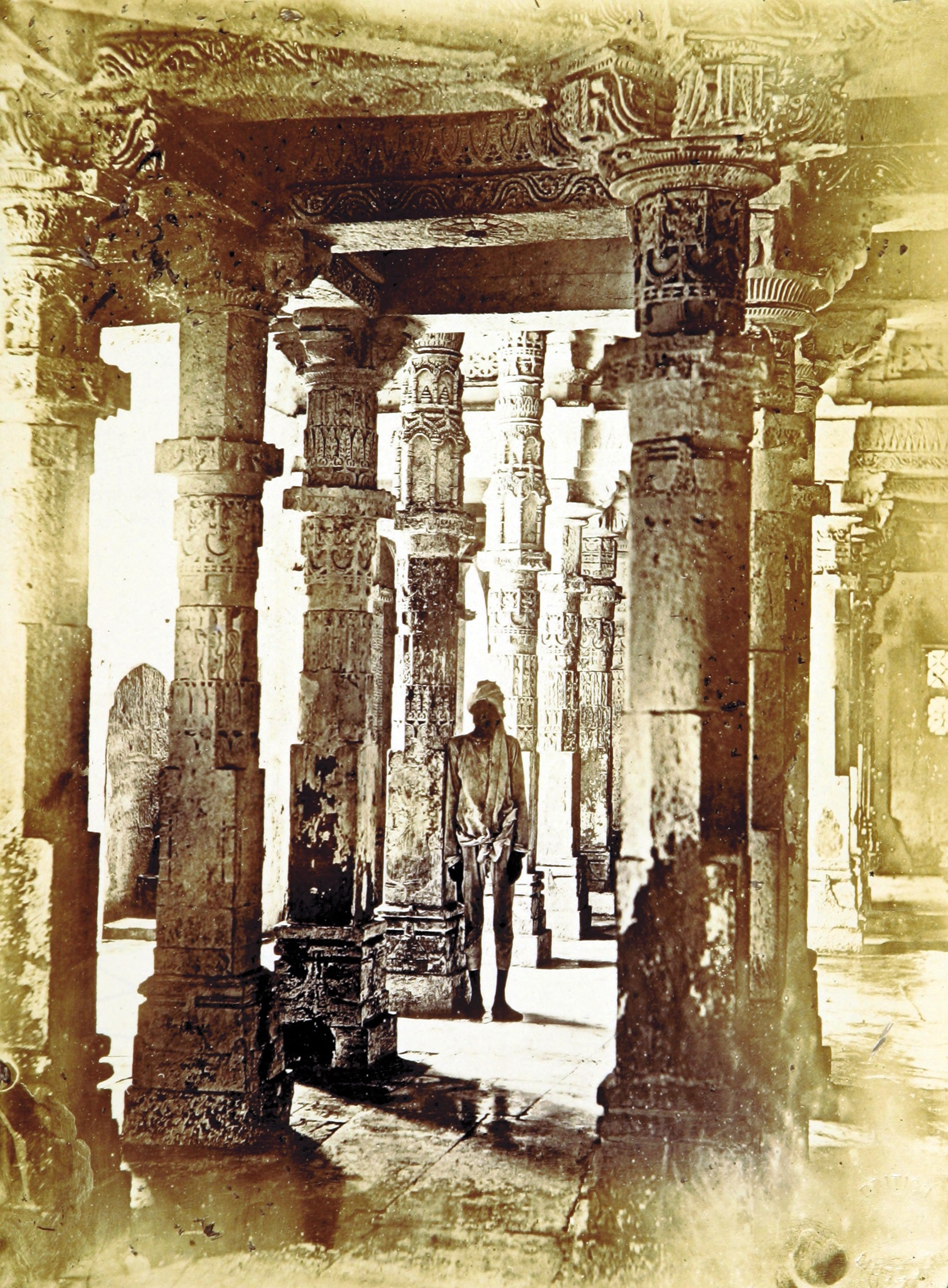
Pillars, showing Hindu origin, 1866

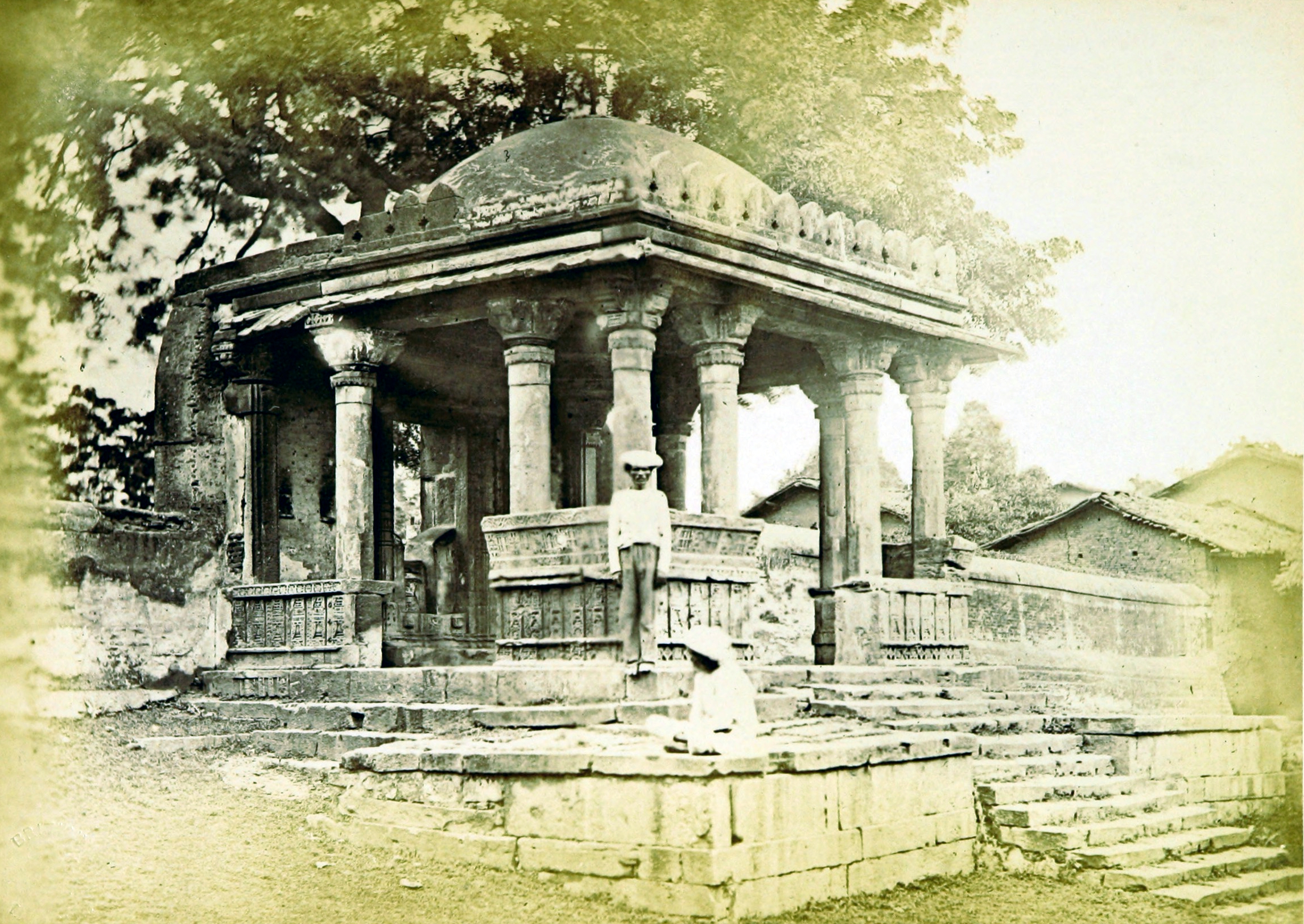
Porch, showing Hindu origin, 1866

== See also ==
- Islam in India
- List of mosques in India
- List of Monuments of National Importance in Gujarat
