= Malik Alam's Mosque =

Former mosque in Ahmedabad, Gujarat, India

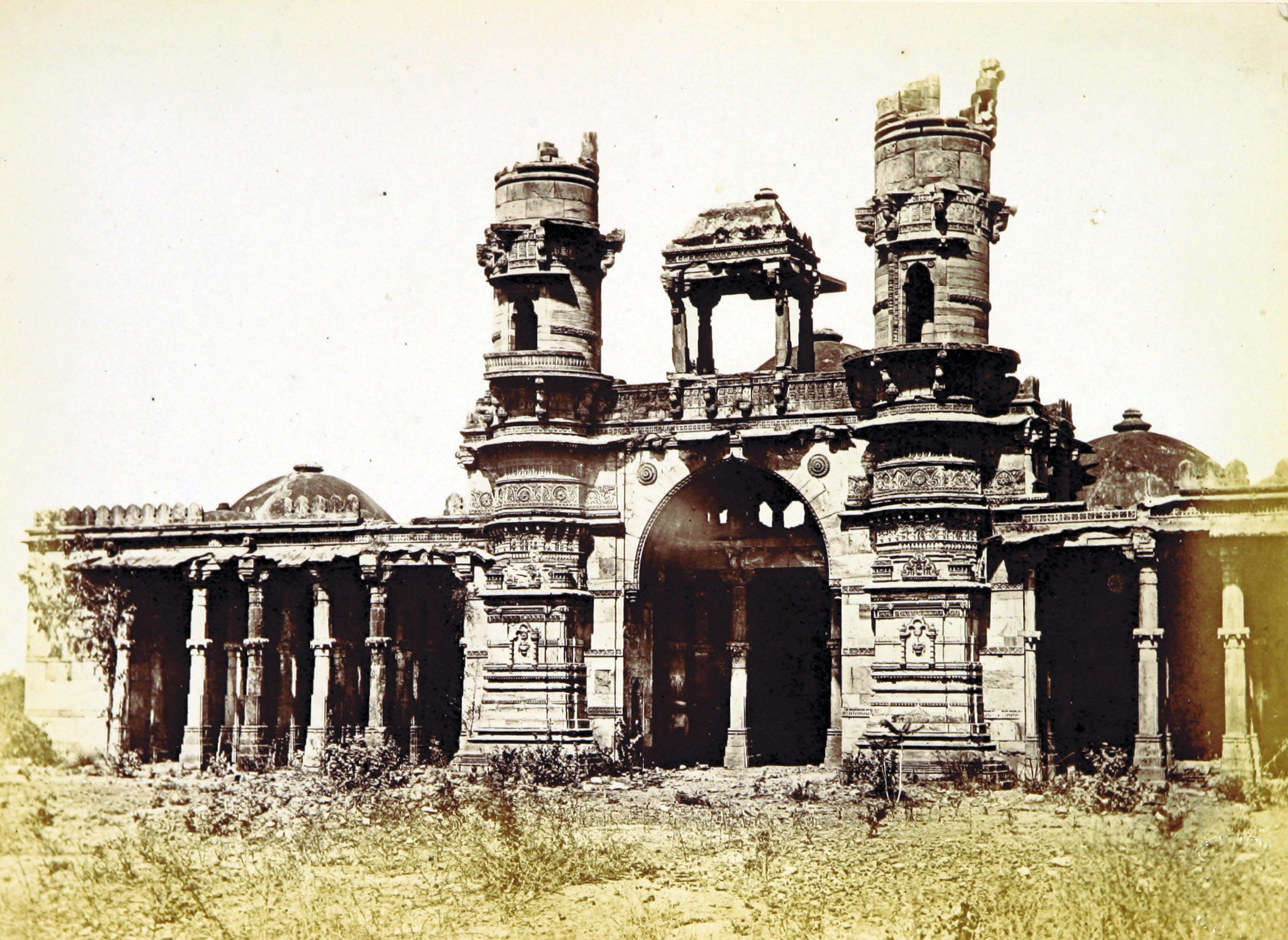
- The former mosque in 1866

- Location of the former mosque in Ahmedabad

Religion
- Affiliation: Islam (former)
- Ecclesiastical or organizational status: Mosque (former); and dargah
- Status: Inactive; (partial ruinous state)

Location
- Location: Shah Alam area, Ahmedabad, Gujarat
- Country: India
- Interactive map of Malik Alam's Mosque
- Coordinates: 23°00′03″N 72°35′13″E

Architecture
- Type: Mosque architecture
- Style: Indo-Islamic; Hindu temple
- Funded by: Malik Alam bin Kabir
- Completed: 1422

Specifications
- Dome: 5
- Minaret: 2 (partially damaged)

Monument of National Importance
- Official name: Malik Alam's Mosque
- Reference no.: N-GJ-36

Malik Alam's Mosque, also known as Peer Kamaal's Mosque, is a former mosque, now in partial ruins, in the Shah Alam area of Ahmedabad, in the state of Gujarat, India. The structure is a Monument of National Importance.

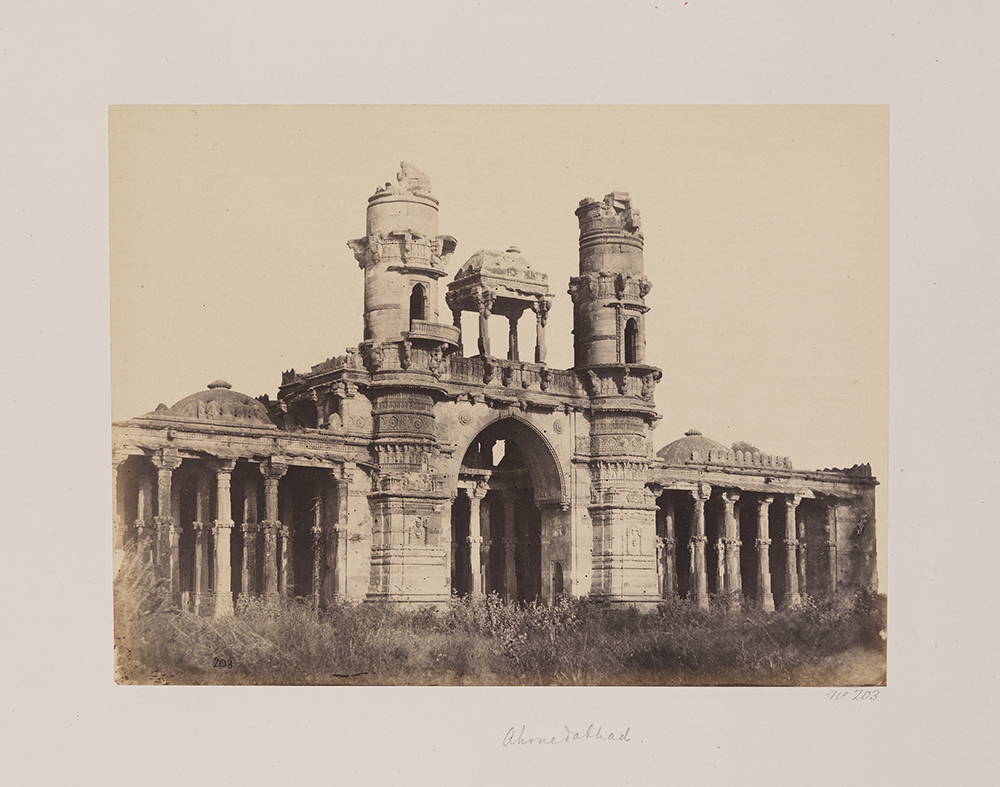
Mosque in 1855

== History ==
Malik Alam's Mosque was built in 1422 by one of Sultan Ahmed Shah I's sons-in-law, Malik Alam bin Kabir, styled Vazir-ul-Mamalik.

== Architecture ==
Compared with the earlier buildings in the Ahmedabad, the mosque shows greater skill in fitting the niche and ornament of Hindu temple spires to the base of the Indo-Islamic minaret.

Archaeologist James Burgess wrote in 1900:

It will be seen that [the mosque] has five domes and the roof is supported by 72 pillars (counting those in the open sections of the façade on each side) together with 44 pilasters. The interior dimensions are 112 feet 7 inches by 31 feet 8 inches, and the end and back walls are 3 feet 3 inches thick, that in front being 5 feet 11 inches...the central dome is considerably the higher, but there is in the façade only one large pointed arch in the middle, on each side of the minarets. In the back wall were five marble mihrabs, two in each end, facing the open colonnades, and the central one facing the great arch… The minarets above the level of the façade had been shaken when the upper portions were thrown down, and together with a small canopy on four pillars that stood between the turrets, they were taken down by the Public Works Department about 1882.|Archaeological Survey of Western India, VII by James Burgess

Both minarets were damaged in the 1819 Rann of Kutch earthquake. The mosque is threatened by encroachment and illegal construction.

== See also ==
- Islam in India
- List of mosques in India
- List of Monuments of National Importance in Gujarat
