= Baba Lului's Mosque =

Mosque in Ahmedabad, Gujarat, India

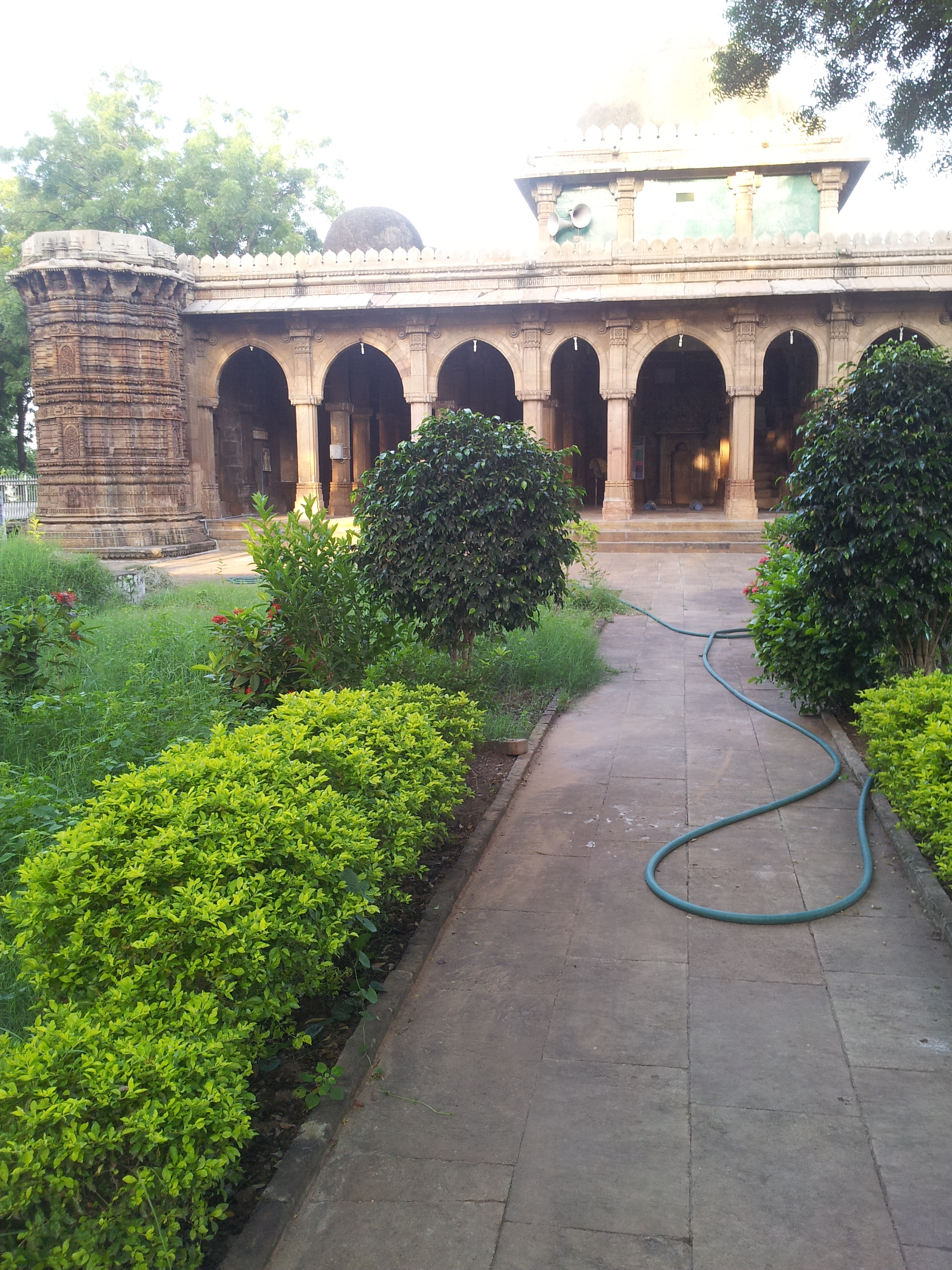

- Location in Ahmedabad

Religion
- Affiliation: Sunni Islam
- Sect: Sufism
- Ecclesiastical or organizational status: Mosque and dargah
- Status: Active

Location
- Location: Behrampura, Ahmedabad, Gujarat
- Country: India
- Interactive map of Baba Lului's Mosque
- Coordinates: 23°00′32″N 72°34′33″E

Architecture
- Type: Mosque architecture
- Style: Indo-Islamic architecture
- Founder: Baba Lului
- Completed: 1560

Specifications
- Length: 21 m (69 ft)
- Width: 11 m (37 ft)
- Dome: Seven (maybe more)
- Minaret: Two (partially damaged)

Monument of National Importance
- Official name: Baba Lului's Mosque
- Reference no.: N-GJ-41

Baba Lului's Mosque, also known as Baba Lavlavie's Masjid, is a Sufi mosque and dargah complex in Behrampura area of Ahmedabad, India. The structure is a Monument of National Importance.

== History and architecture ==
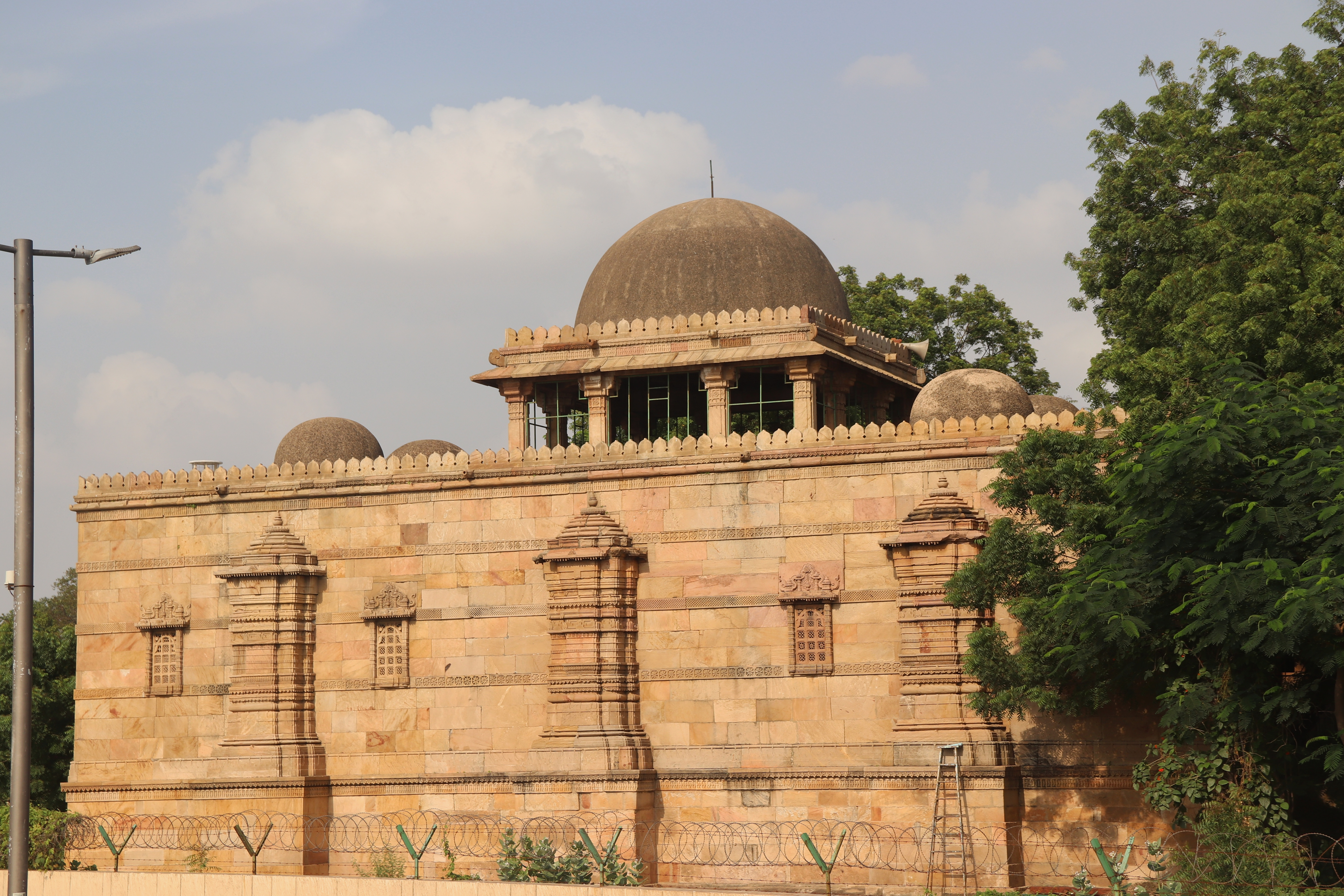
Mosque from back

The mosque was built in c. 1560 by Baba Lului, or Baba Muhammad Jafar, believed to be a pearl merchant. The interior dimensions of the mosque are 21 metres (69 ft) long and 11 metres (37 ft) wide. There are twelve pillars which are two storeys high, support the central dome. There are more forty-four pillars which support the roof of the mosque and the arches in the façade. There are four perforated stone windows in the back wall and the three mihrabs of carved marble. There are two minarets are on each end of the façade, with a base of 1.3 square metres (14 sq ft), and their niches are decorated with floral patterns. The mosque was damaged in 2001 Gujarat earthquake and was restored by Archaeological Survey of India.

== See also ==
- Islam in India
- List of mosques in India
- List of Monuments of National Importance in Gujarat
