= Sardar Khan's Roza =

Mosque and tomb complex in Ahmedabad, India

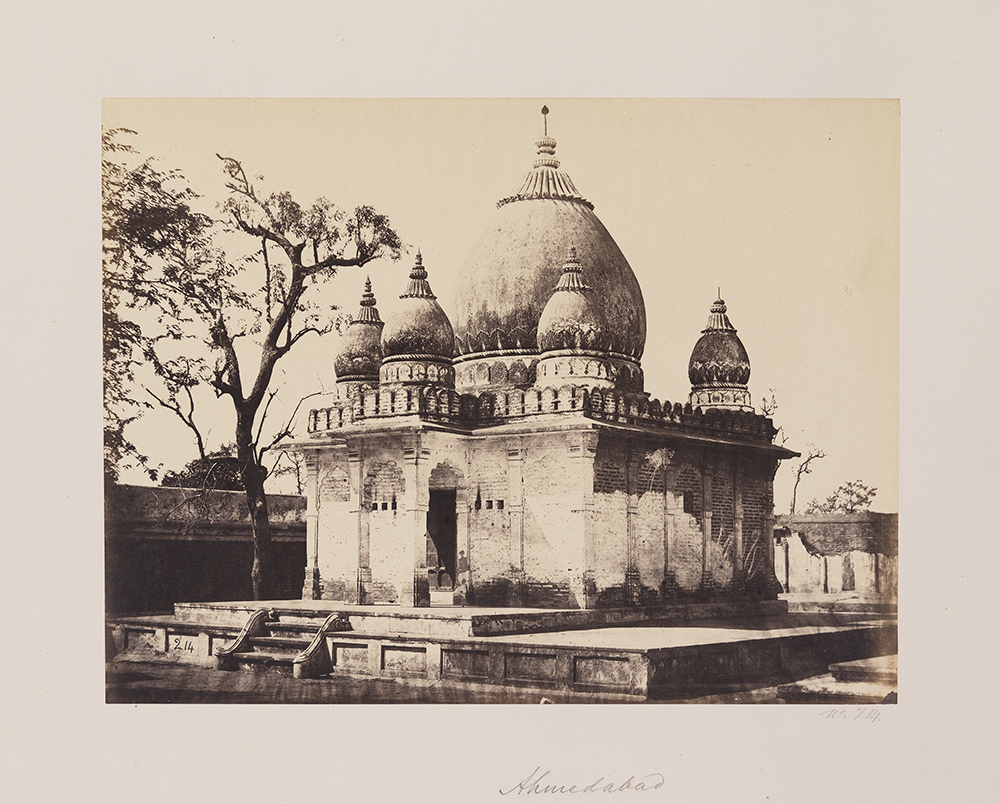
- Nawab Sardar Khan's Roza c. 1860

- Location of the roza in Ahmedabad

Religion
- Affiliation: Sunni Islam
- Sect: Sufism
- Ecclesiastical or organizational status: Dargah and mosque
- Status: Active

Location
- Location: Jamalpur, Ahmedabad, Gujarat
- Country: India
- Interactive map of Sardar Khan's Roza
- Coordinates: 23°00′56″N 72°35′02″E

Architecture
- Type: Mosque architecture
- Style: Indo-Islamic; Mughal; Persian domes
- Completed: 1685

Specifications
- Dome: Nine
- Minaret: Two

Monument of National Importance
- Official name: Sardar Khan's Roza and its compound bearing C.S.No. 6811; Nawab Sardar Khan Masjid and outer gate in survey No. 6814
- Reference no.: N-GJ-42 and 43

Sardar Khan's Roza, also known as Nawab Sardar Khan's Mosque and Tomb, is a Sufi mosque and dargah complex in the Jamalpur area of Ahmedabad, in the state of Gujarat, India. The structures are Monuments of National Importance.

== History ==
Sardar Khan was a minister of Ahmedabad during Mughal rule. After Dara Shikoh lost the battle of Deorai (near Ajmer) in 1659, he fled to Gujarat and attempted to enter its capital, Ahmedabad. Sardar Khan, however, deposed the governor Shaikh Ahmad Bukhari who had been appointed by Dara Shikoh, and declared allegiance to Aurangzeb. The next year Sardar Khan was appointed fauzdar of Bharuch by the emperor Aurangzeb. In 1662, Sardar Khan was transferred to Idar to stamp out local rebels. From 1664 to 1684, he served as fauzdar of Sorath (Saurashtra), taking residence at its capital of Junagadh. In 1684, he was sent to Thatta in Sindh where he soon died. His body was brought to Ahmedabad and installed in the tomb he had built for himself.

== Architecture ==
Sardar Khan's Roza was built in 1685. The tomb of Sardar Khan was built of stone and had a marble floor. The mosque was made of bricks situated on high platform, and the façade of the mosque had three pointed arches and two minarets on either side. The minarets were four storeys high, which were octagonal at the base and circular in the upper parts. This minaret had gilt balls on the top and had three large onion shaped domes, while the gateway had two domes too. The tomb and mosque have been encroached since 1884 and are in bad shape now.

== Gallery ==
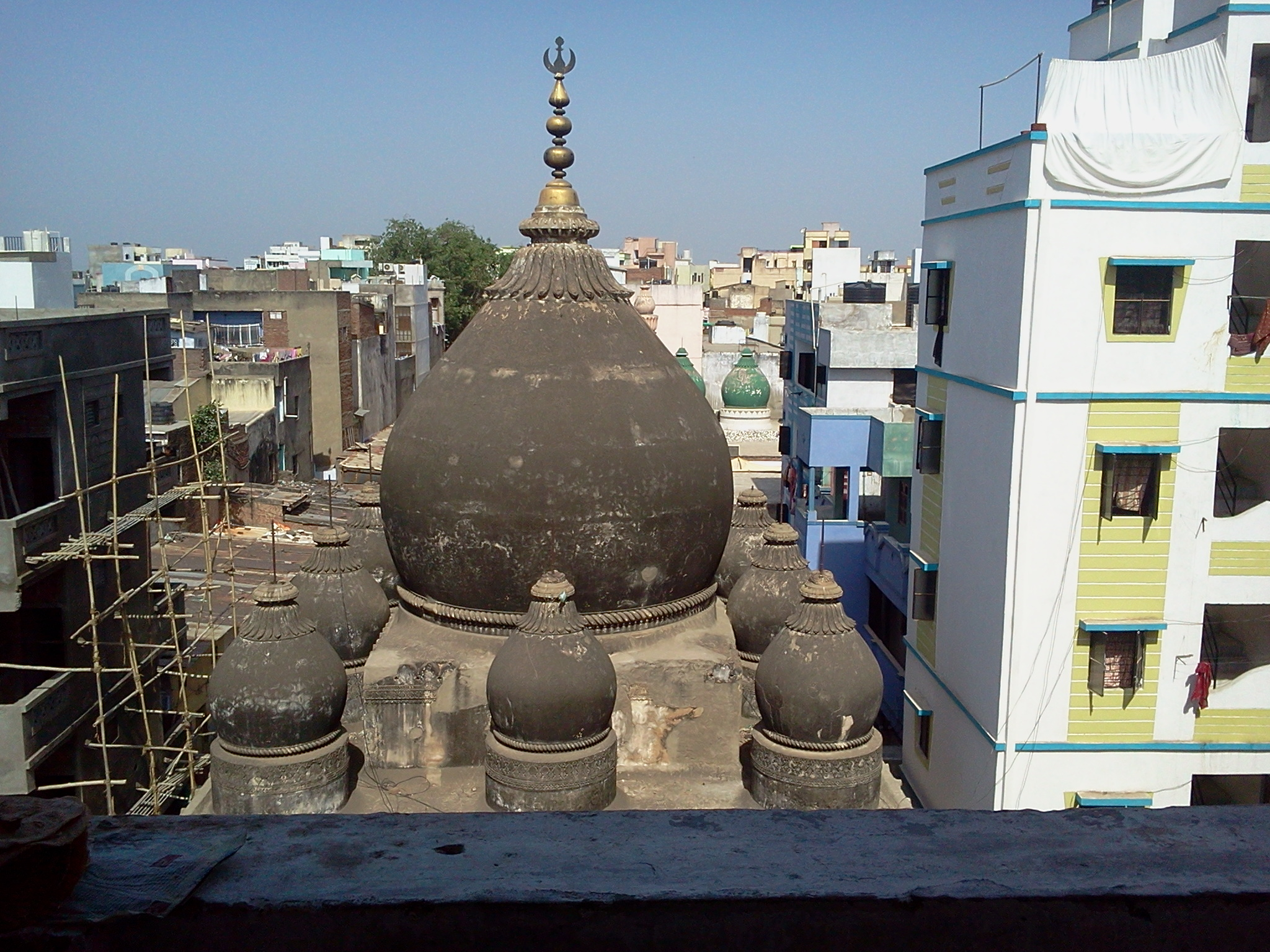
Top view of tomb

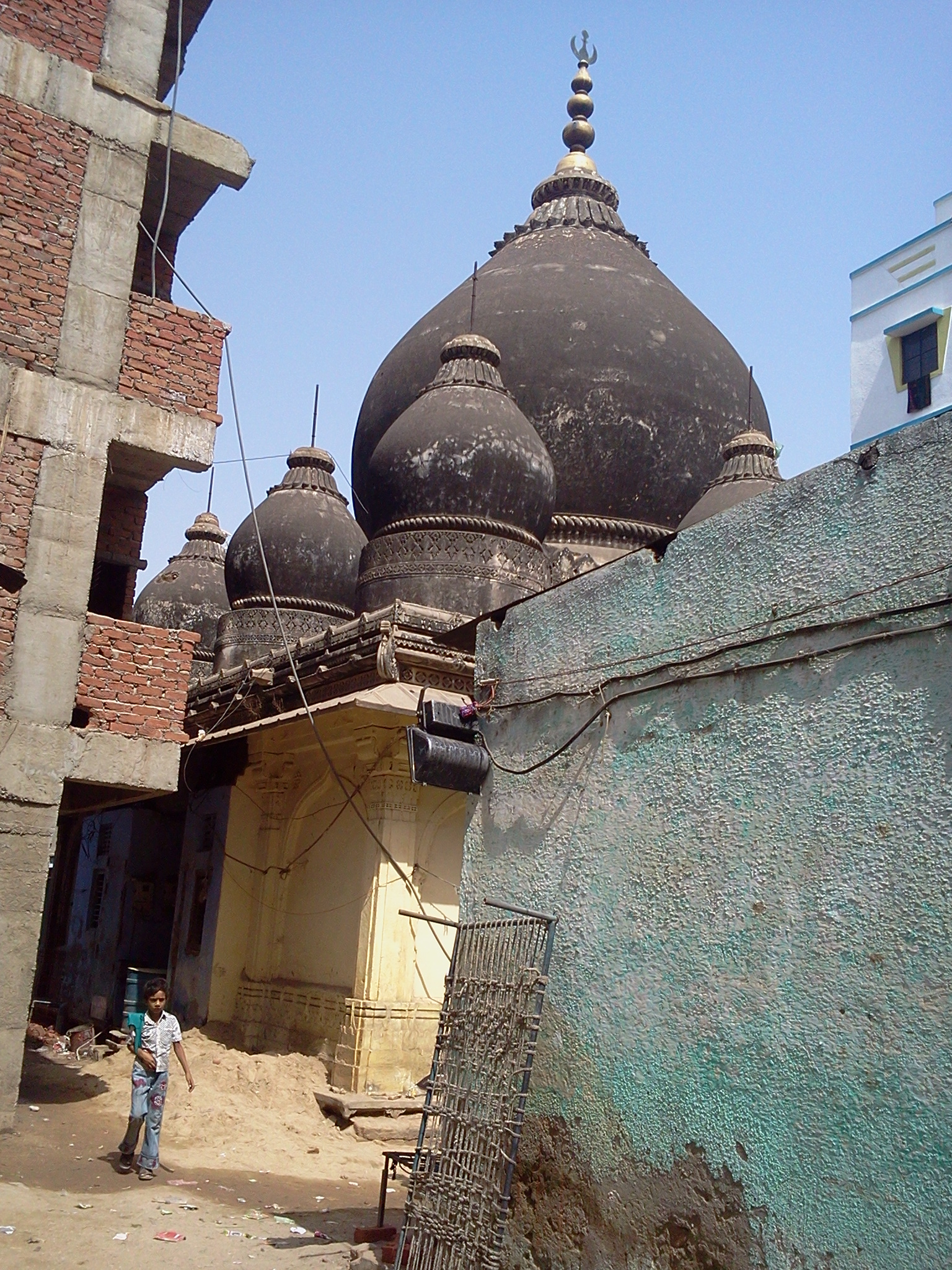
Side view of encroached tomb site
