= Shahpur Mosque =

Mosque in Ahmedabad, Gujarat, India

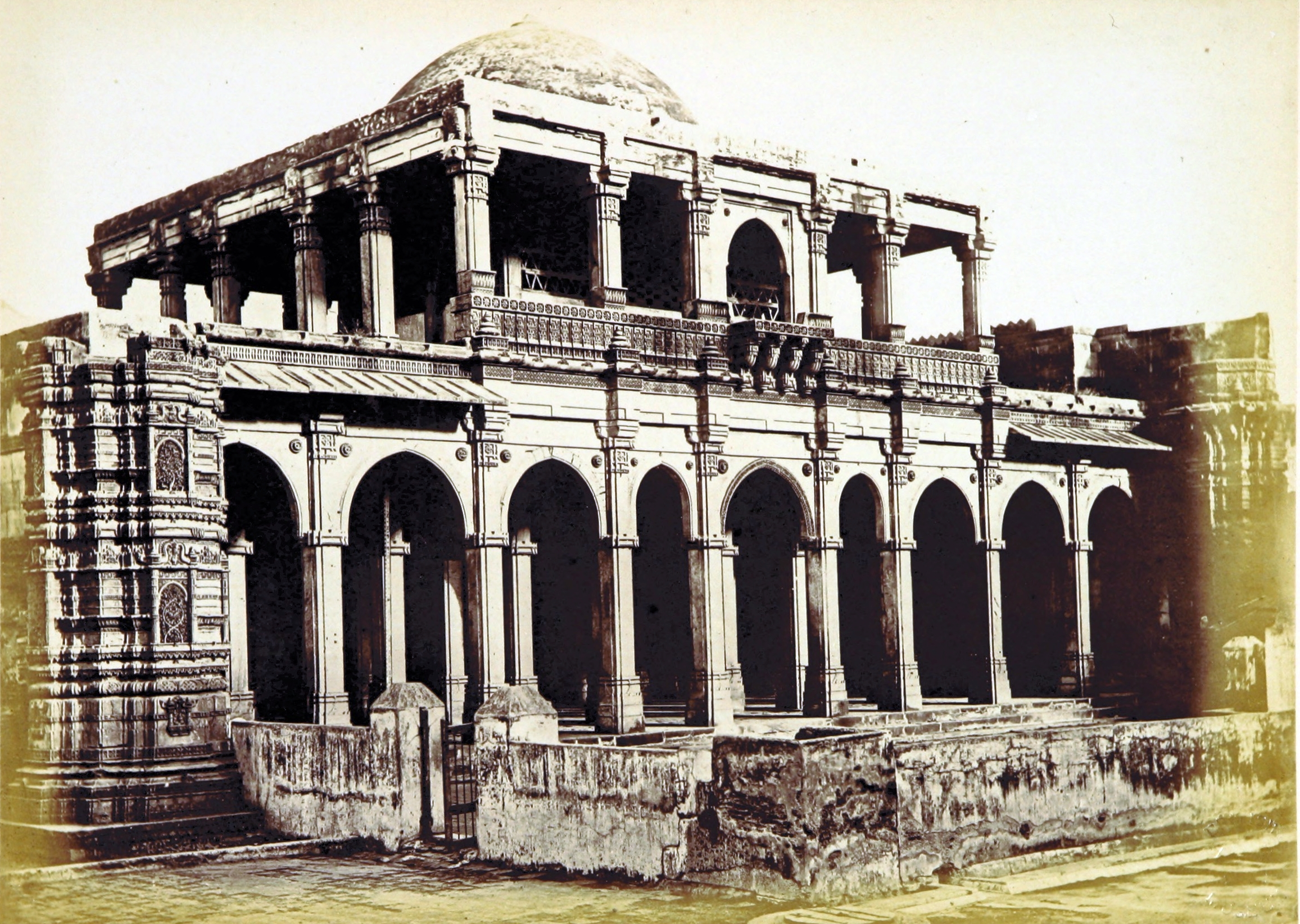
- Shahpur Mosque in 1866

- Location in Ahmedabad

Religion
- Affiliation: Sunni Islam
- Sect: Sufism
- Ecclesiastical or organizational status: Mosque
- Status: Active

Location
- Location: Ahmedabad, Gujarat
- Country: India
- Interactive map of Shahpur Mosque
- Coordinates: 23°02′16″N 72°34′50″E

Architecture
- Type: Mosque architecture
- Style: Indo-Islamic architecture
- Founder: Shaikh Husain Muhammad Chishti
- Completed: 1565

Specifications
- Length: 18 m (59 ft)
- Width: 12 m (38 ft)
- Dome: One
- Minaret: Two

Monument of National Importance
- Official name: Shahpur Kazi Mohmad Chisti's Masjid
- Reference no.: N-GJ-28

The Shahpur Mosque, also known as Shahpur Paththarwali Masjid or Kazi Mohammed Chishti's Mosque, is a Sufi mosque located near Shahpur Gate in Ahmedabad, in the state of Gujarat, India. The structure is a Monument of National Importance.

== Overview ==
Shahpur Mosque was built in 1565, by Shaikh Husain Muhammad Chishti (d.1574) of the Shahpur Qazi religious order. It was never finished. The dimensions are 18 metres (59 ft) long by 12 metres (38 ft) wide. The body, simple and graceful, arched in the under story, and except the central window flat in the upper, is an attempt to combine the pillared and arched styles. The minarets, perhaps in too great contrast to the plainness of the body of the building, are for richness of ornament and delicacy of tracery equal to any mosque in Ahmedabad. The central dome positioned on second floor is supported by twelve pillars. There are forty-four more pillars which support the roof and arches in the façade.

== Gallery ==
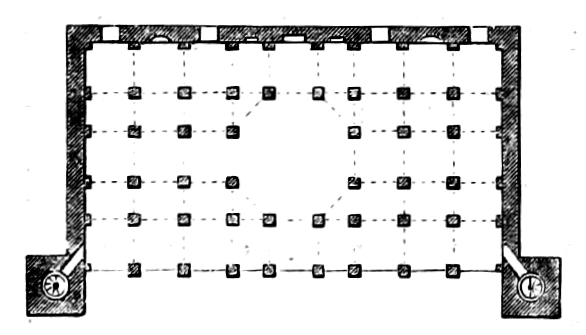
Plan of the mosque

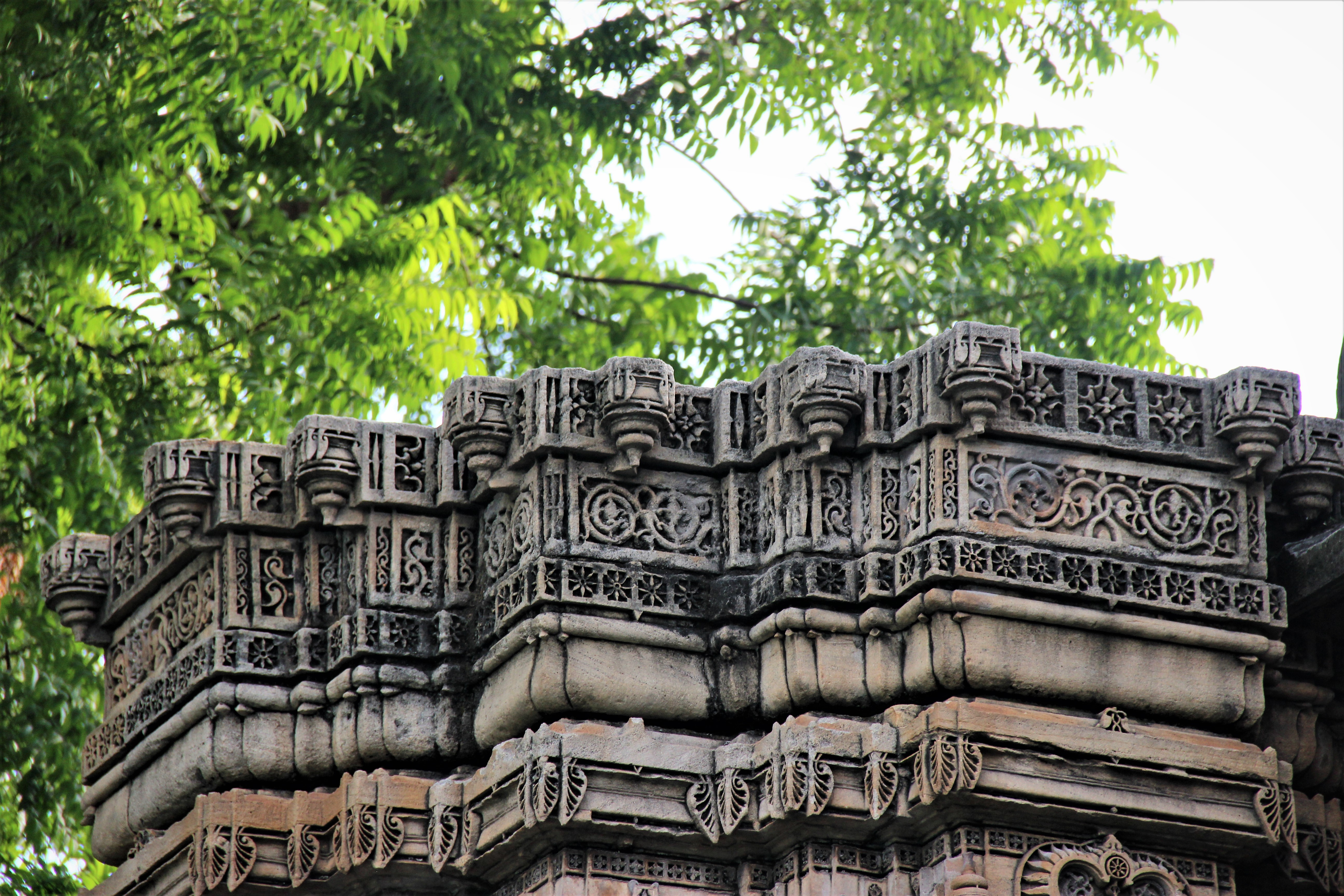
Stone carvings in 2017

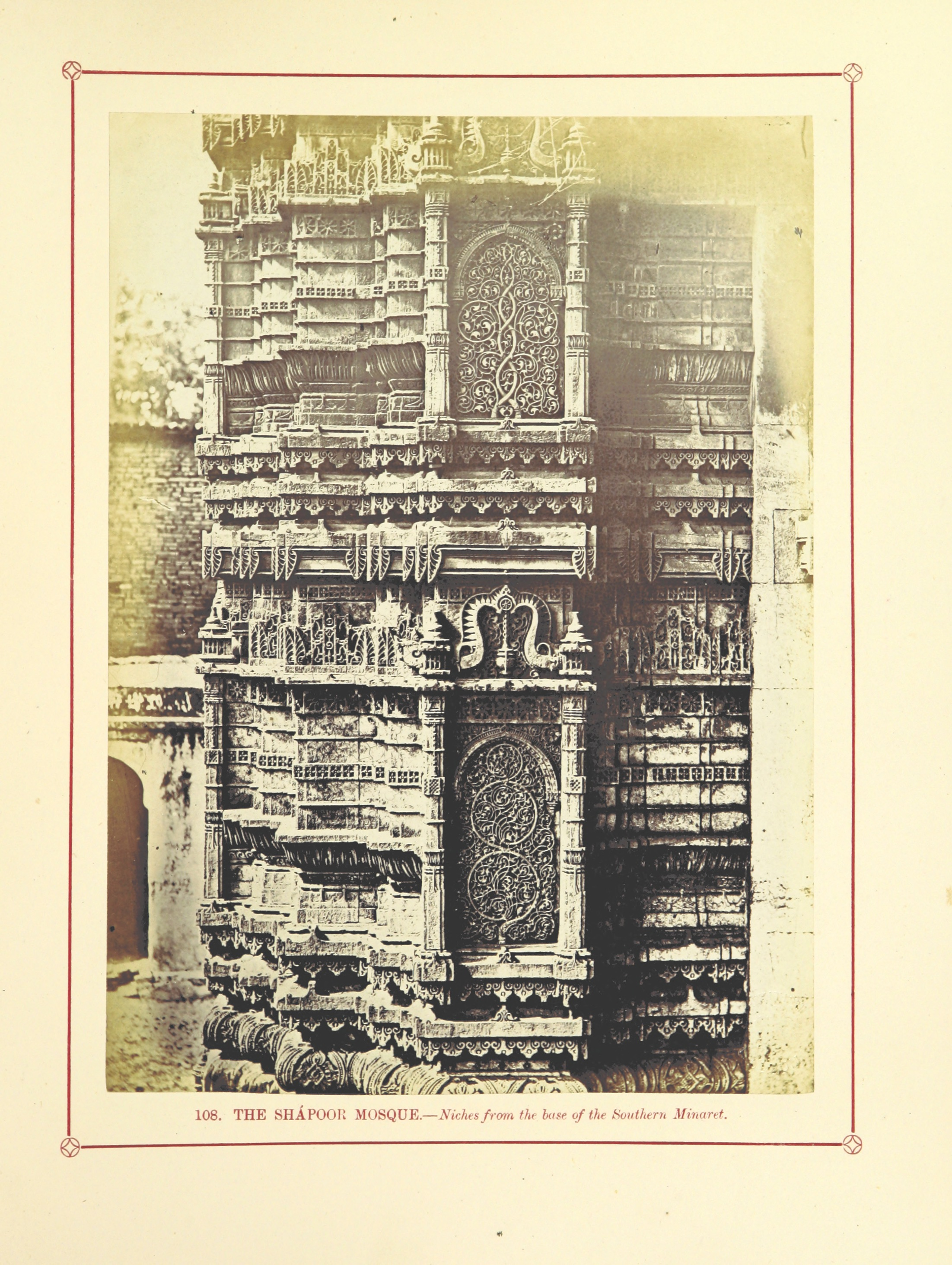
Niches from the base of southern minaret

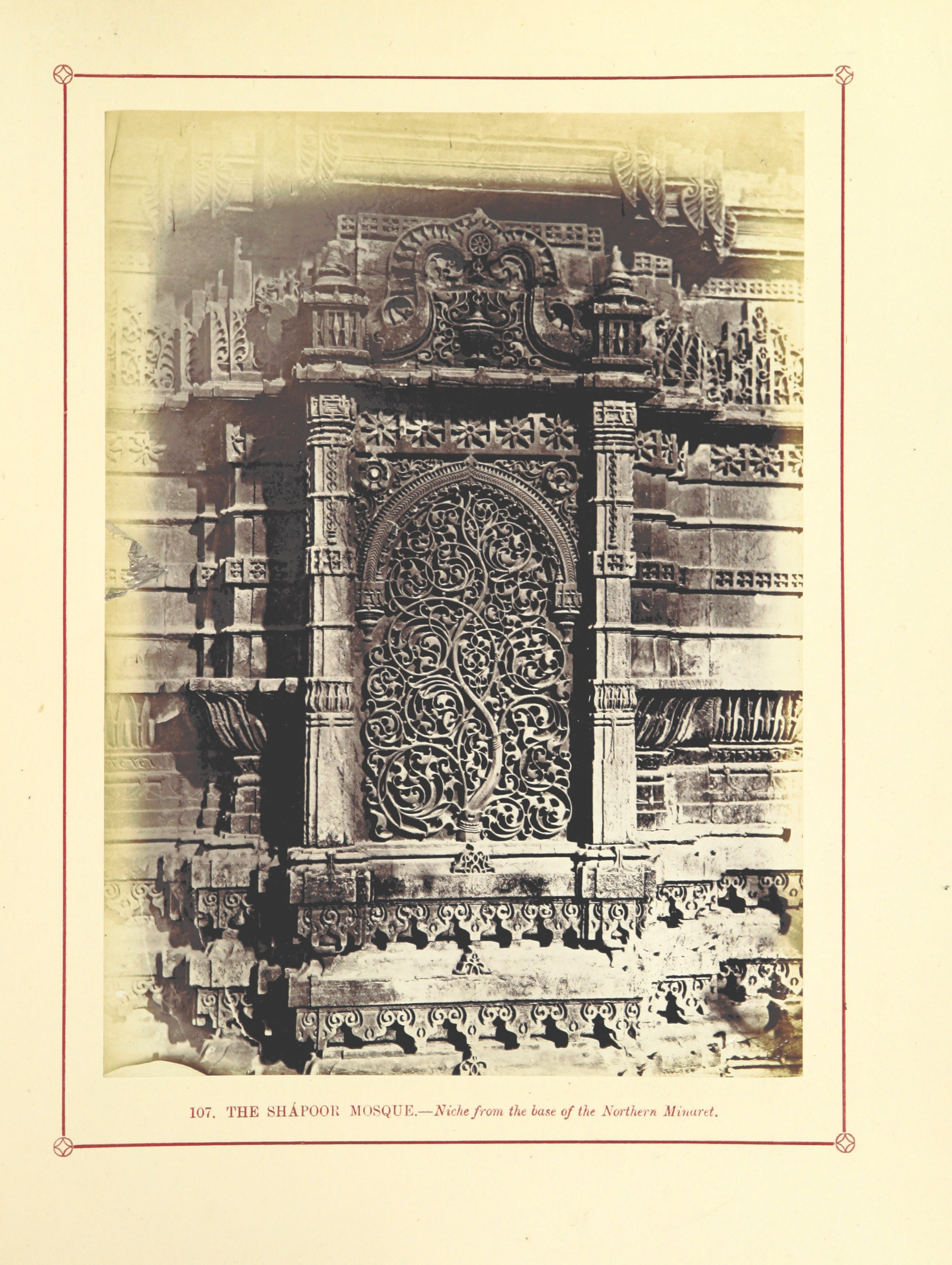
Niches from the base of northern minaret

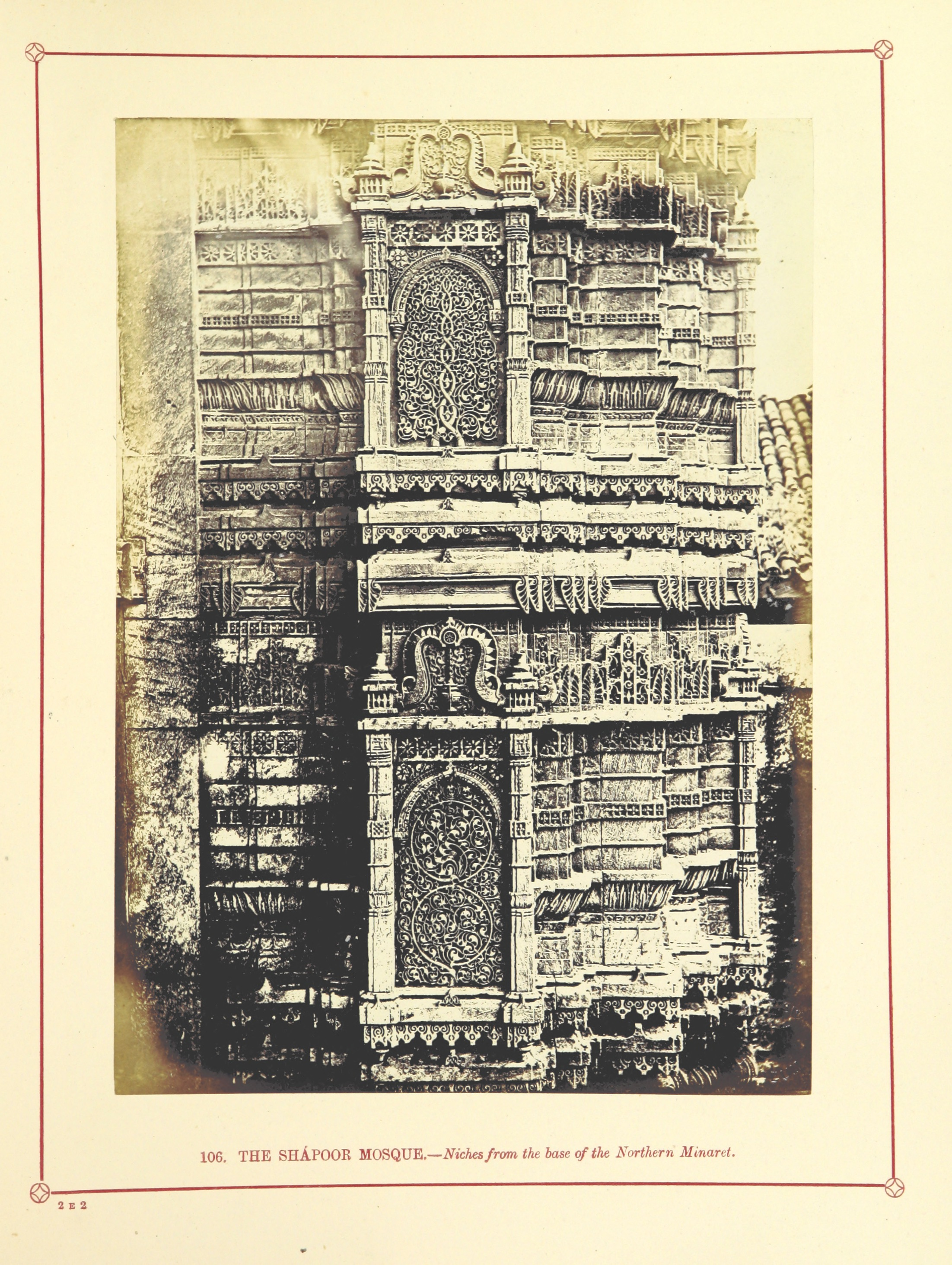
Niches from the base of northern minaret

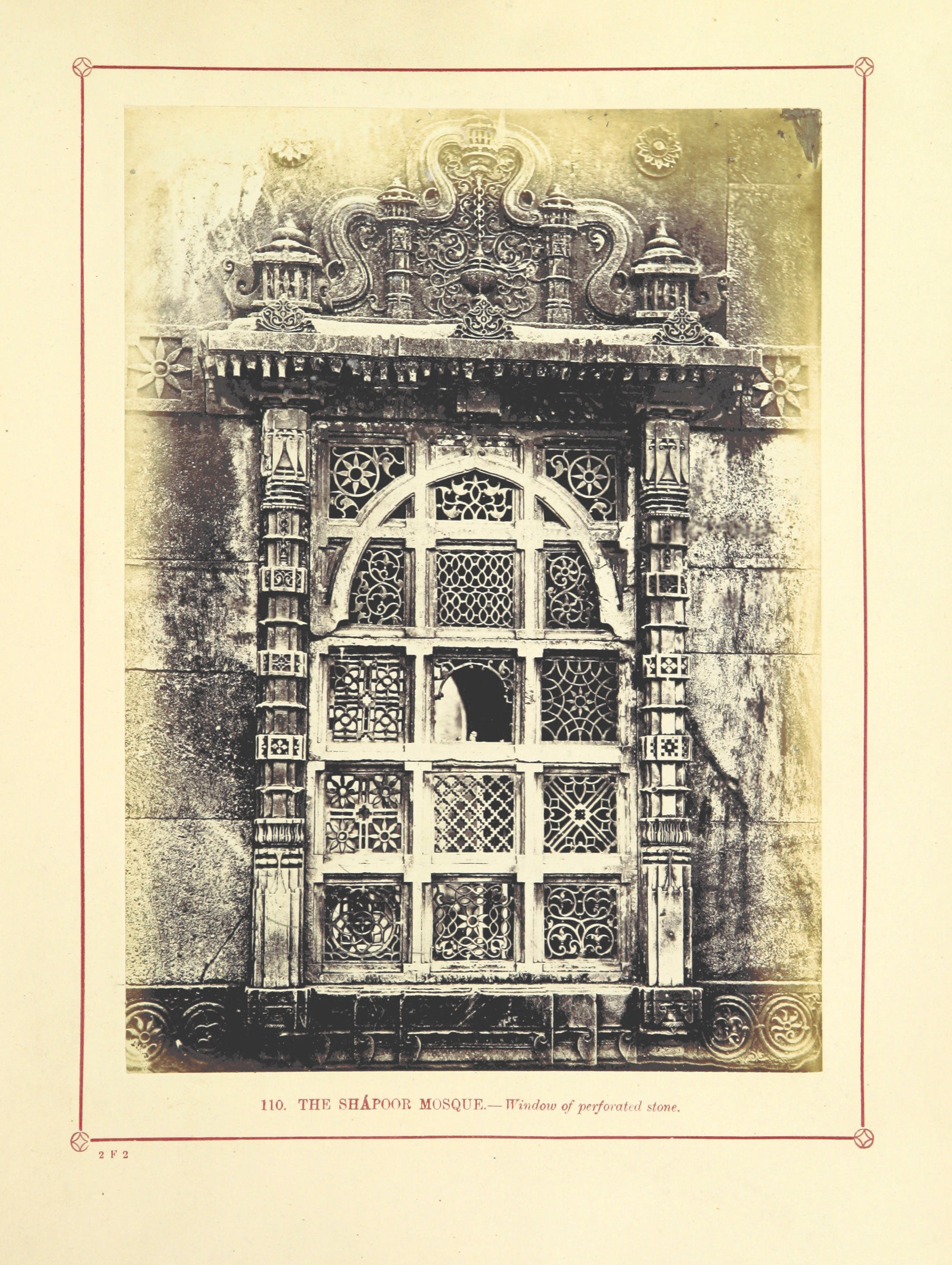
Window of perforated stone

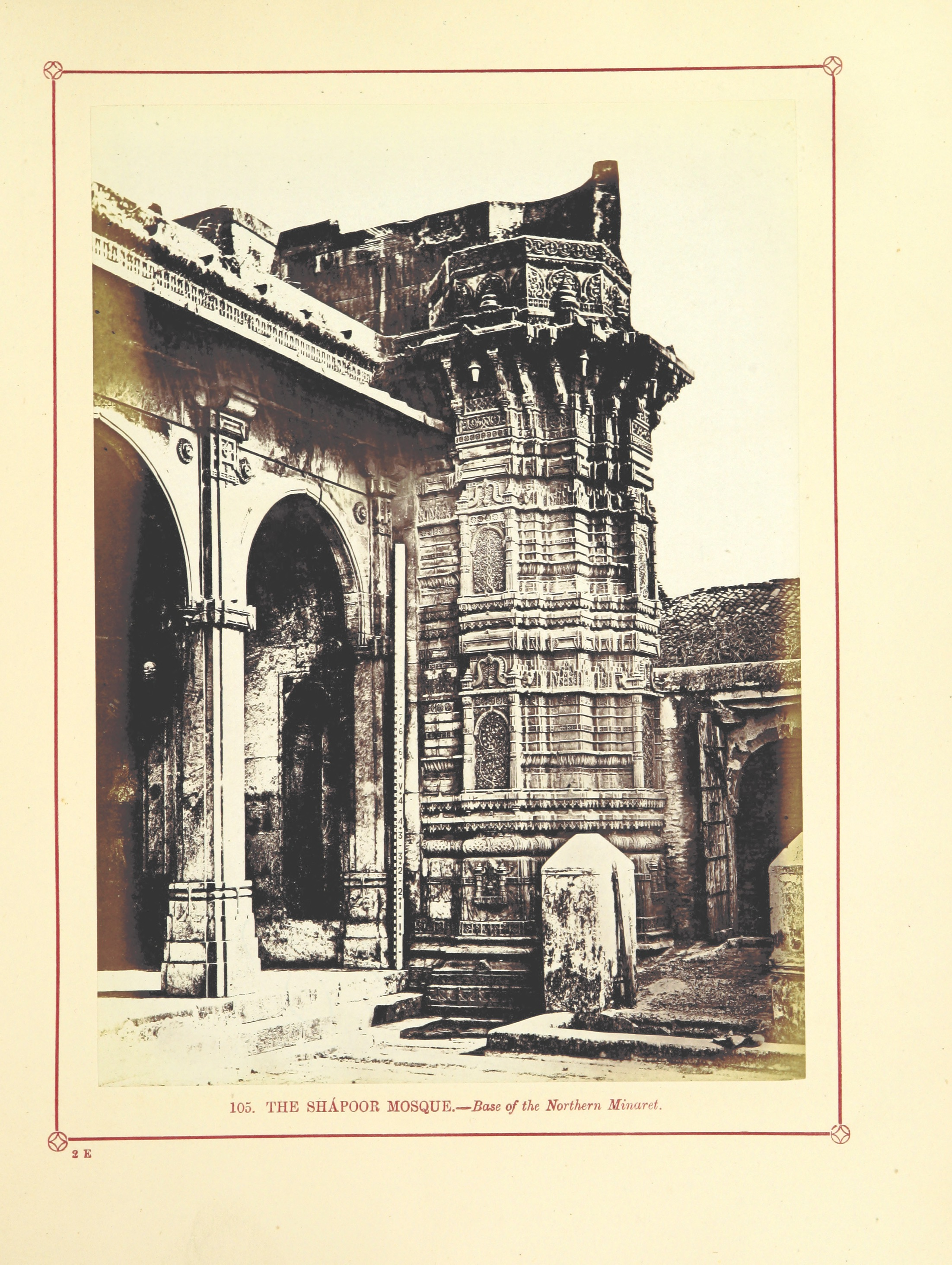
Base of northern minaret

== See also ==
- Islam in India
- List of mosques in India
- List of Monuments of National Importance in Gujarat
