= Qutbuddin Mosque =

Mosque in Ahmedabad, Gujarat, India

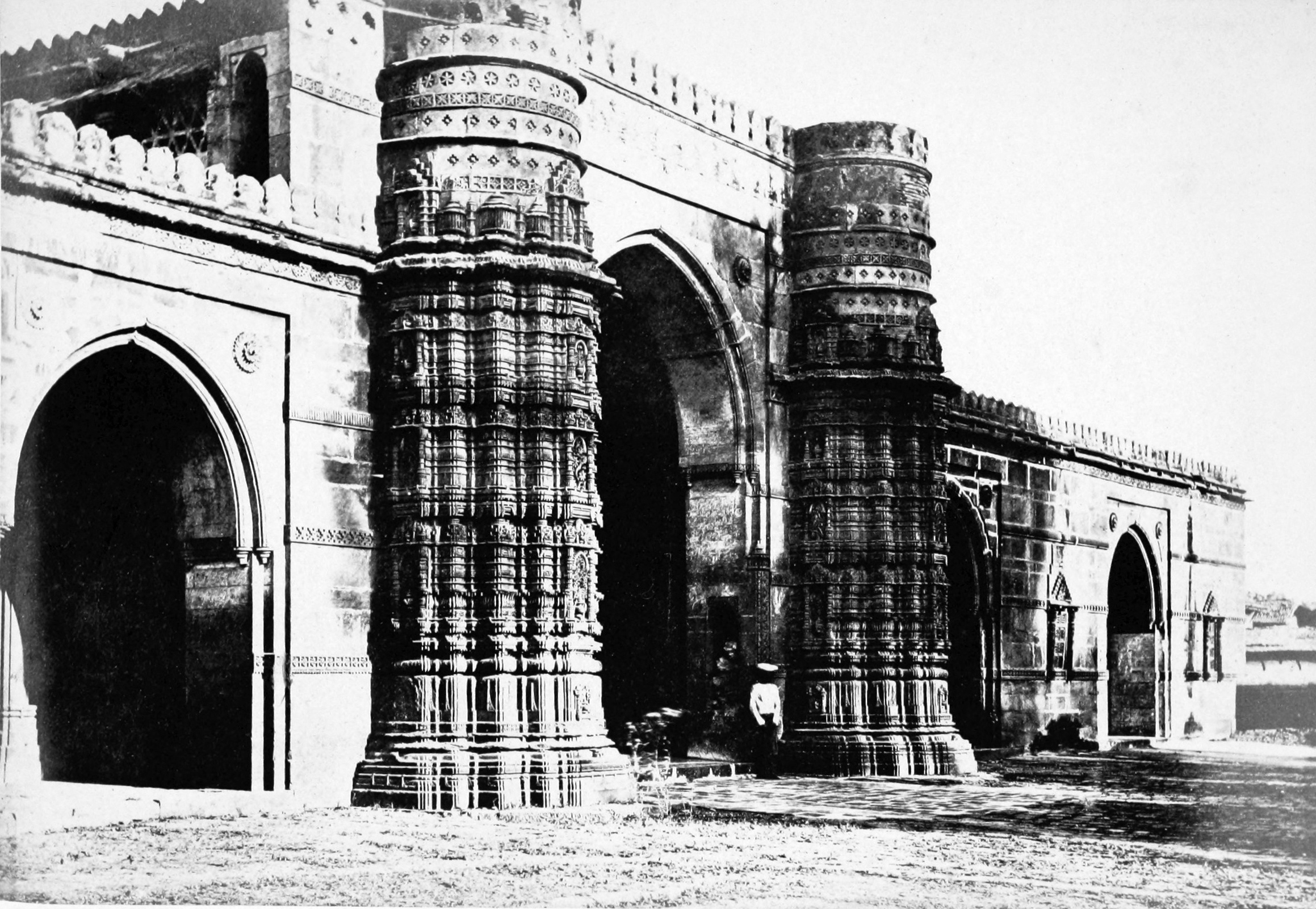
- Qutb al-Din Shah's Mosque, 1866

- Location in Ahmedabad

Religion
- Affiliation: Islam (former)
- Ecclesiastical or organizational status: Mosque (former)
- Status: Inactive; (partial ruinous state)

Location
- Location: Old Ahmedabad, Gujarat
- Country: India
- Interactive map of Qutbuddin Mosque
- Coordinates: 23°02′07″N 72°35′15″E

Architecture
- Type: Mosque architecture
- Style: Indo-Islamic; Hindu temple
- Founder: Sultan Qutb-ud-din
- Completed: 1446

Specifications
- Dome: 15
- Minaret: Two (partially destroyed)

Monument of National Importance
- Official name: Qutub Shah's Mosque
- Reference no.: N-GJ-16

The Qutbuddin Mosque, formally the Qutb al-Din Shah Mosque, is a former mosque, now in partial ruins, built in 1449 in the Old City of Ahmedabad, in the state of Gujarat, India. The structure is a Monument of National Importance. Although the mosque is not considered a distinctive building by scholars, it exemplifies the progression of the Indo-Islamic architectural style of Ahmedabad in the 15th century.

== History ==
The Mosque of Qutb al-Din Shah was built during the short reign of Ahmad Shah II (1451 - 1458), who acquired the title Qutb al-Din Shah following his ascension to the throne. Nevertheless, an inscription band situated within the central mihrab of the mosque gives the date 1449 as the year of foundation, falling during the reign of his predecessor and father, Muhammad Shah II.

Despite the confusion regarding the date of foundation, scholars ascribe the building to Ahmad Shah II, who was reported in an earlier source under the name Jalal Khan, son of Muhammad Shah II. Ahmad Shah II, who was reported to be a tyrannical and vindictive ruler, spent the eight years of his reign in wars against the sovereigns of Malwa and Chittoor. He famously had a longstanding feud with the dervish (Saint) Shah Alam, who had served as his advisor before the fallout.

Besides the mosque carrying his name, he constructed two more buildings during his reign, namely, the great mosque of Rajapur and the artificial tank, Hauz-i-Qutb, at Kankariya.

=== Location ===
The former mosque is located at the northern end of the walled city of Ahmedabad. It stands on the right of the main street leading from the market to the Delhi Gate, approximately 270 metres (300 yd) from the gate. Part of the structure on the north east side protrudes into the straight line of the street. In 1864, a proposal was submitted to the municipality to cut off the protruding structure to align the building with the street. The mosque, which had initially extended over an area of 5,253 square metres (6,283 yd^{2}), lost about a fifth of its area to roads and a private property on which huts have been built. The mosque has also been used for storage of cotton bales, and portions have been cut off by partitions to be used as dwellings.

=== Architecture and design ===
The Mosque of Qutb al-Din Shah is characteristic of the Indo-Islamic architectural style, featuring a markedly Hindu temple-influenced exterior. The mosque does not represent any substantial architectural development; its immediate prototype is Ahmed Shah's Mosque, which shares the same plan yet differs in scale and exterior decorative scheme. The Qutb al-Din Shah mosque has been criticised by scholars for its stiff proportions. Scholars consider it an unsuccessful attempt at combining an arched façade with a columnar interior.

=== Exterior ===
The mosque is a large rectangular structure, 45 by 11 metres (149 by 37 ft), and is distinguished by its robust and intricately decorated buttresses which are distinctively Hindu-inspired and served as bases for the now lost twin minarets. The buttresses are engaged to the arched prayer hall screen which is made of five arched entries, flanking the central slightly raised arched entrance, enabling it to stand out. The buttresses are decorated with horizontal carved mouldings which are divided vertically and feature panels with floral patterns on the front side of each buttress. The Western (Qibla) side facing the street features buttresses marking the location of the mihrabs inside the prayer hall. The structure has four windows on the frontal façade, and six windows at the back, all recessed with carved stone screens. A series of crenellations runs along the top of the whole building.

The mosque is topped by five large domes and ten smaller domes, with flat interspaces supported on sixty pillars. The central dome is raised on eight stellate pillars, giving it height of one storey above the general roof, however scholars argue that the height was not sufficient to harmonise the proportions of the building.

The courtyard before the mosque includes a square cistern from which water was raised by a wheel for ablution.

=== Interior ===
The prayer hall is equipped with five mihrabs, all featuring rectangular and semi-circular recesses made out of stone, while the main mihrab is made of white and grey marble, and includes a recently inserted inscription band giving the date of construction of the mosque and the architect, Nizam son of Hallu Sultani. The hall is also equipped with a modest three steps minbar.

== Gallery ==
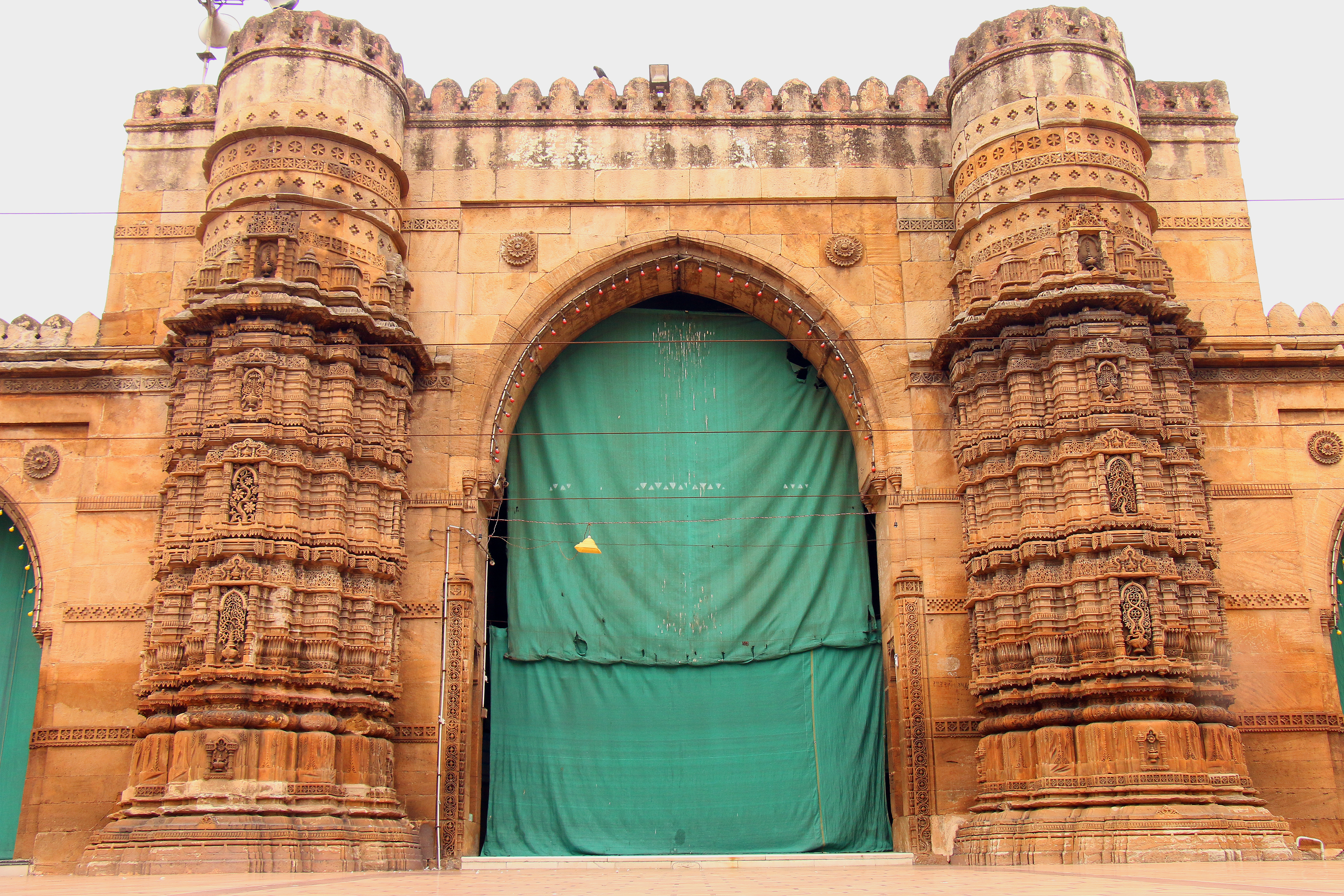
The former mosque in 2018

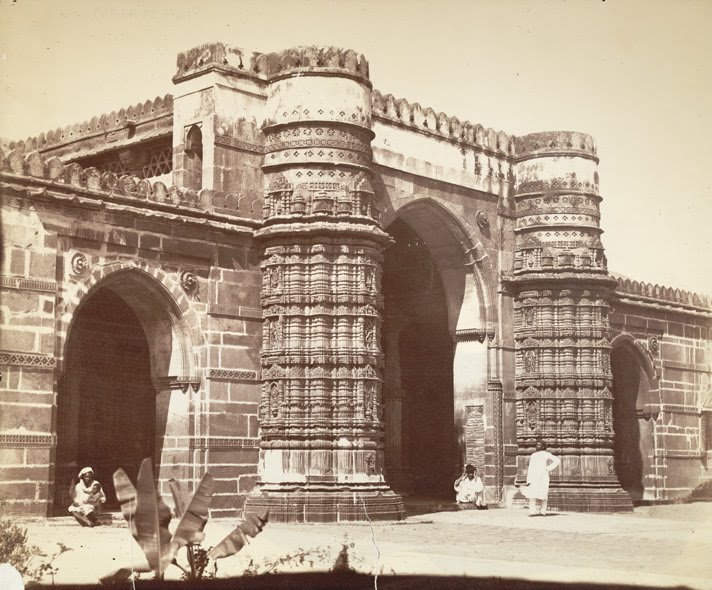
The mosque, c. 1880

== See also ==
- Islam in India
- List of mosques in India
- List of Monuments of National Importance in Gujarat
