= Dastur Khan's Mosque =

Mosque in Ahmedabad, Gujarat, India

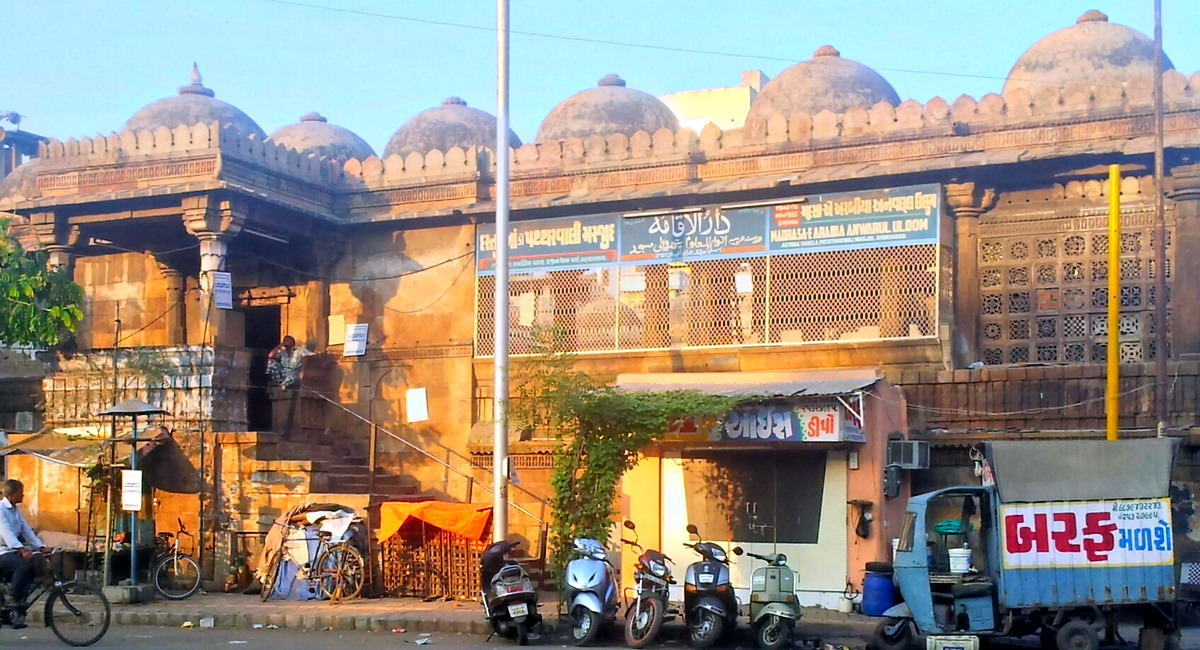
- The mosque in 2012

- Location in Ahmedabad

Religion
- Affiliation: Islam
- Ecclesiastical or organizational status: Mosque
- Status: Active

Location
- Location: Ahmedabad, Gujarat
- Country: India
- Interactive map of Dastur Khan's Mosque
- Coordinates: 23°01′04″N 72°35′21″E

Architecture
- Type: Mosque architecture
- Style: Indo-Islamic
- Founder: Dastur Khan
- Completed: 1463 or 1486
- Dome: Six (maybe more)

Monument of National Importance
- Official name: Dastur Khan's Mosque
- Reference no.: N-GJ-33

Dastur Khan's Mosque, also known as Paththarwali Masjid, is a mosque in Ahmedabad, in the state of Gujarat. India. The structure is a Monument of National Importance.

== Overview ==
The mosque is located south of Jama Masjid near the Astodiya Gate. The mosque was built in 1463 or 1486 during the reign of Mahmud Begada in the city by Dastur Khan, also known as Malik Khasazada, one of his ministers.

The tomb of Dastur Khan is located near the south doorway in an open courtyard within the complex of the mosque. The courtyard walls are decorated with perforated stone windows.

== Gallery ==
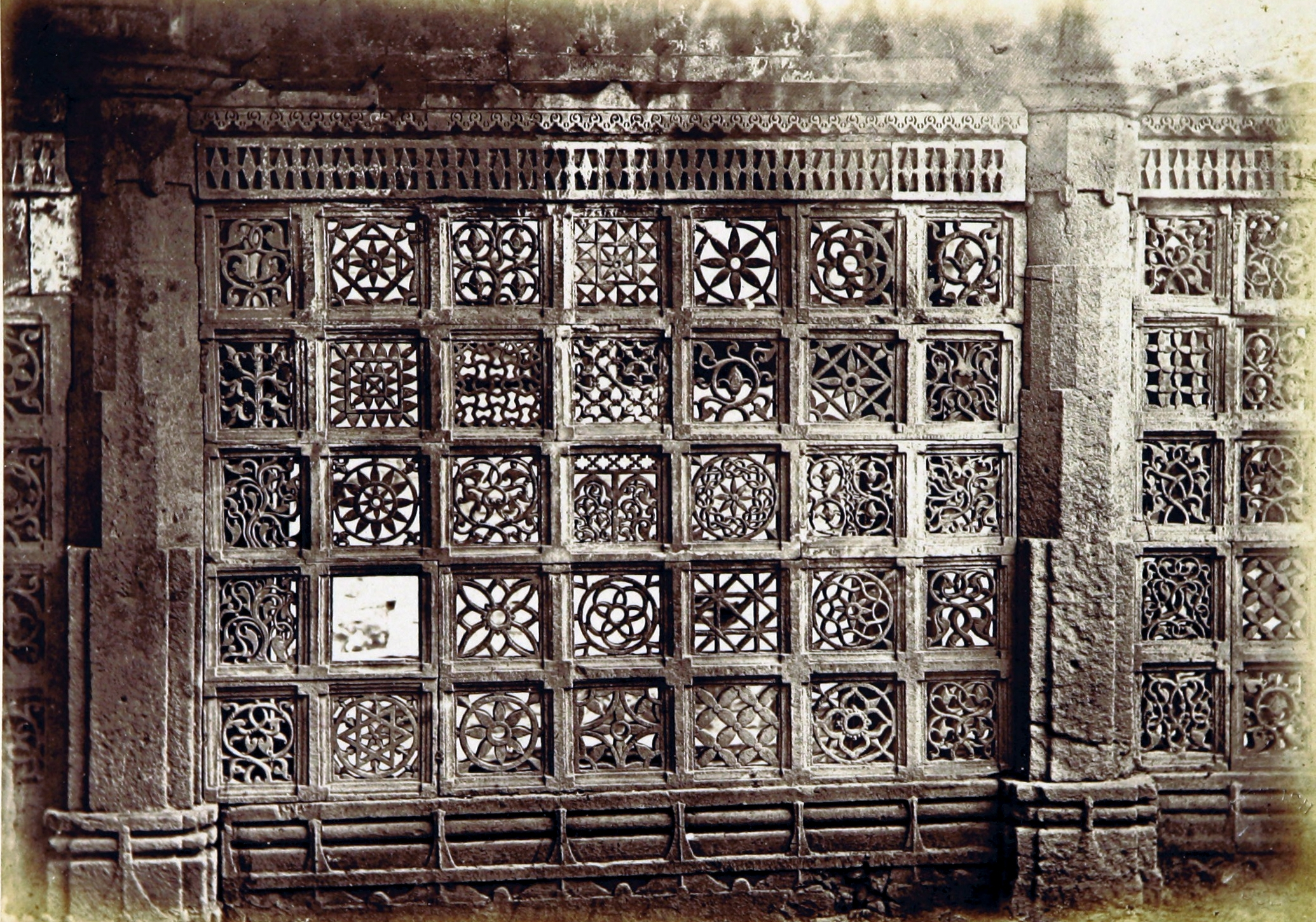
Perforated stone windows of the mosque

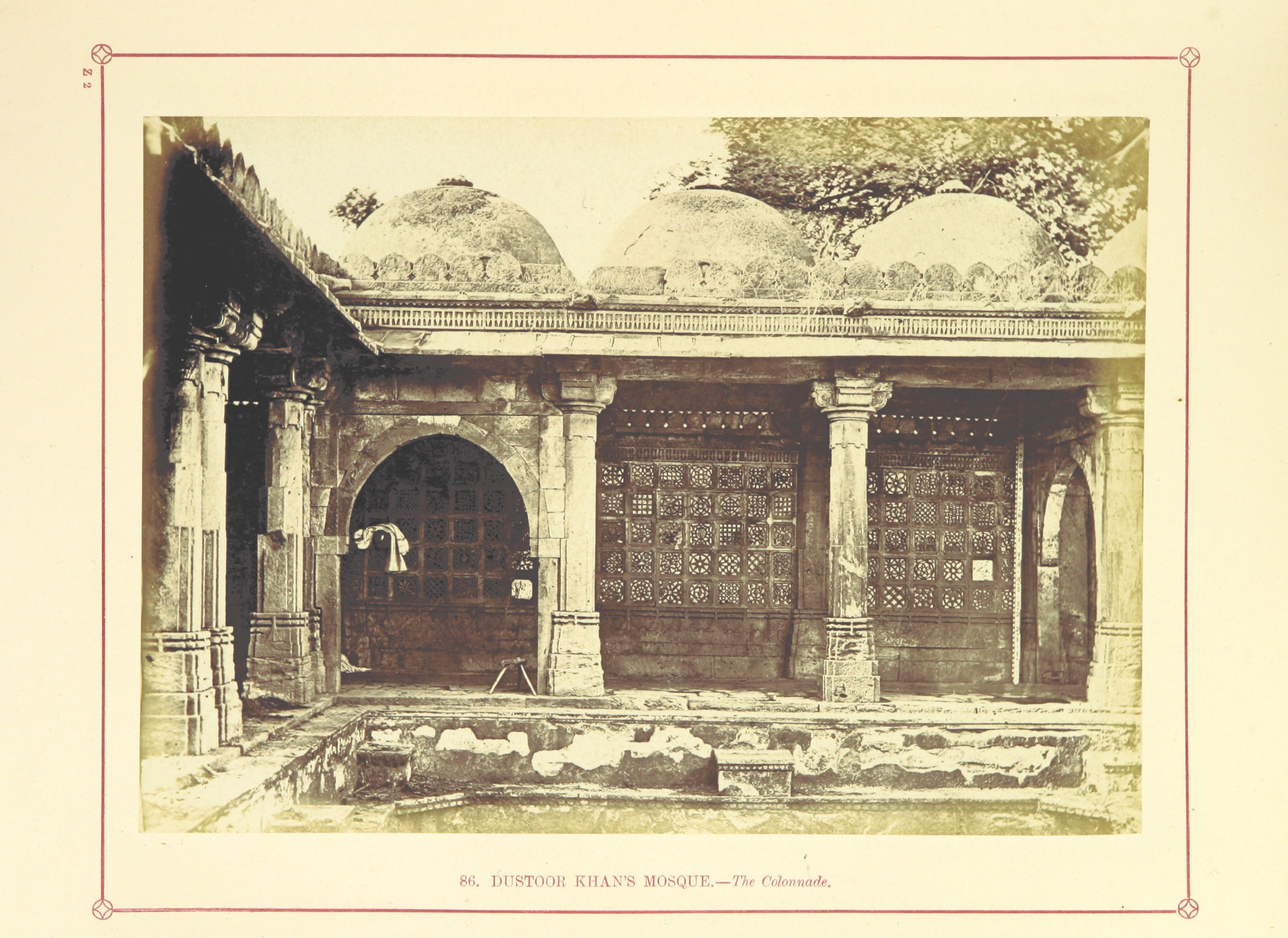
The colonnade

== See also ==
- Islam in India
- List of mosques in India
- List of Monuments of National Importance in Gujarat
