= Malik Isan's Mosque =

Former mosque in Ahmedabad, Gujarat, India

- Location of the former mosque in Ahmedabad

Religion
- Affiliation: Sufi Islam (former)
- Ecclesiastical or organizational status: Mosque (former)
- Status: Inactive; (partial ruinous state)

Location
- Location: Isanpur, Ahmedabad, Gujarat
- Country: India
- Interactive map of Malik Isan's Mosque
- Coordinates: 22°58′45″N 72°35′57″E

Architecture
- Type: Mosque architecture
- Style: Indo-Islamic
- Founder: Malik Isan
- Completed: c. 1520
- Dome: Five

Monument of National Importance
- Official name: Small Stone Masjid (Gumle Masjid)
- Reference no.: N-GJ-46

Malik Isan's Mosque, also known as Isanpur Mosque or Gumle Masjid, is a former Sufi mosque, now in partial ruins, located in the Isanpur area of Ahmedabad, in the state of Gujarat, India. The structure is a Monument of National Importance.

== History ==
The mosque was built by Malik Isan in c. 1520. Malik Isan or Isan Sultani, entitled Nizam-ul-Mulk, was a noble in the court of Mahmud Begada. He founded the Isanpur suburb of Ahmedabad.

== Architecture ==
The whole complex is built on raised platform which can be approached by porches on north and east side. The courtyard is square and the mosque is situated on the west side. The façade of the mosque is divided in three parts each covered with equal sized domes. The central part is raised than two side domes. The tomb of Malik Isan is situated opposite to the mosque.

The mosque was damaged in 2001 Gujarat earthquake and was again vandalised during 2002 Gujarat violence. The structure is further threatened by encroachments.

== See also ==
- Islam in India
- List of mosques in India
- List of Monuments of National Importance in Gujarat
