= Nalva =

Unit of length

Nalva (from Sanskrit नल्व nalva) is a measure of distance equal to 400 Hastas (Cubits). That is equal to 9600 Aṅgula, which is believed to be equal to approximately 180 metres.

Used in Mahābhārata.
