= Angul (disambiguation) =

Angul may refer to:

- Angul, a town in Odisha, India
  - Angul district, district
  - Angul (Odisha Vidhan Sabha constituency), legislative constituency
  - Angul (Lok Sabha constituency) (defunct), Parliament of India
- Angul (mythology), a legendary founder of the Angles and Danes in Danish mythology
- Aṅgula (lit. 'finger'), an Indian finger-length unit of measurement, equivalent to an inch

== See also ==
- Angula (disambiguation)
