= Dada Harir Stepwell =

Building located in Ahmedabad, India

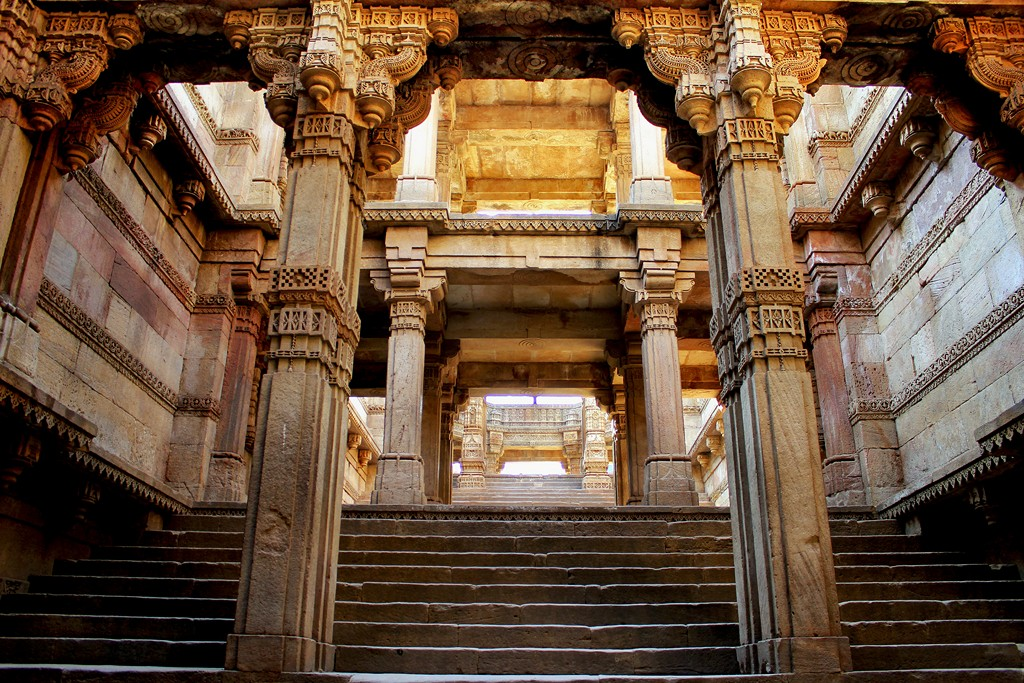
- Stepwell staircase
- Interactive map of the Dada Harir Stepwell area

General information
- Location: Ahmedabad, India
- Coordinates: 23.0402692°N 72.605416°E
- Elevation: 72.6662992 m
- Construction started: 1499
- Completed: 15th century

Technical details
- Floor count: Five storied stepwell

Design and construction
- Architect: Local
- Designations: Monument of National Importance; ASI Monument No. N-GJ-18

Dada Harir Stepwell is a 15th century stepwell in Asarwa area 15 km off Ahmedabad, Gujarat, India.

== History ==
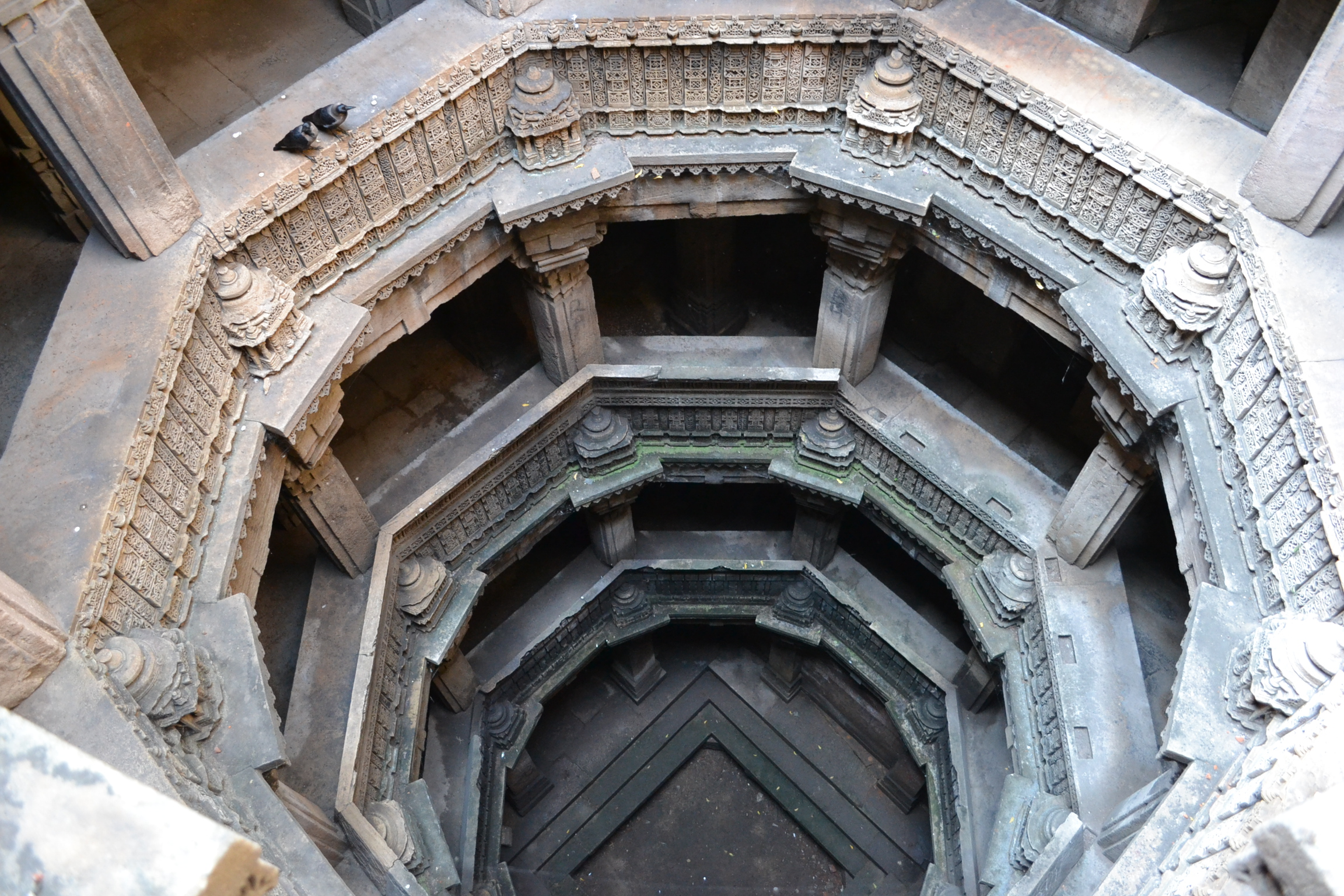
Looking down into the well

The stepwell was built in 1485 by Dhai Harir, a household lady of Mahmud Begada according to the Persian inscription in the stepwell. She served as the superintendent of the royal harem.

Dhai Harir built a mosque and a tomb where she was later buried. The well bears two inscriptions: one in Sanskrit on the south wall and one in Arabic on the north wall of the first gallery.

The Arabic writing reads:

This holy and wholesome water; the splendid travellers' rest-house enclosed on four sides by carved and painted walls, and a grove of fruit trees with their fruit, a well, and a pool of water for the use of man and heist, were built in the reign of the Sultan of the Sultans of the age, established by the grace of God and of the faith, Abul Fath Mahmud Shah, son of Muhammad Shah, son of Ahmed Shah, son of Muhammad Shah, son of Muzaffar Shah the Sultan, may God keep his kingdom. Dated the metropolis of the kingdom the 2nd of Jamadi-ul-awwal in the 26th year of the reign.

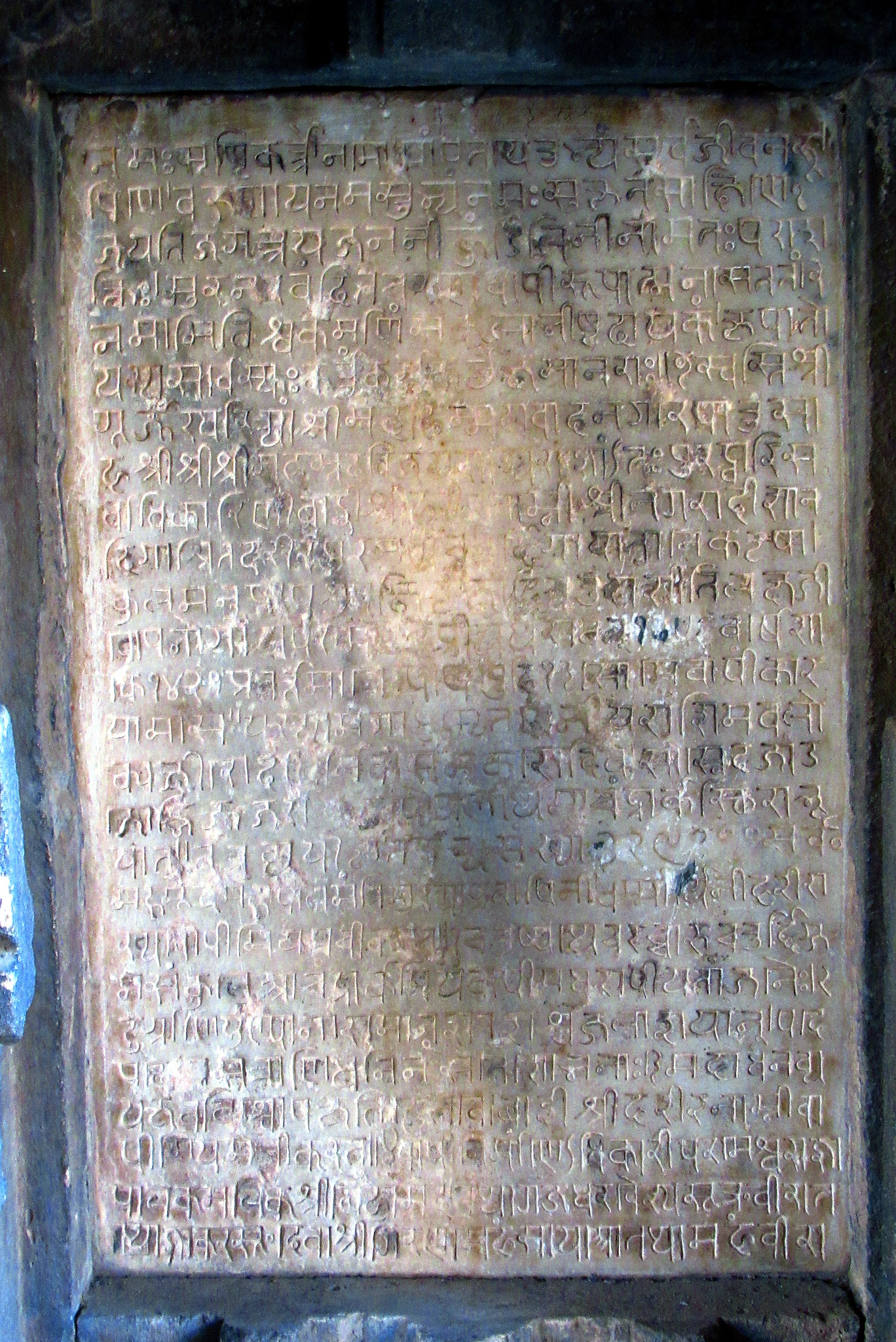
Sanskrit inscription

A Sanskrit inscription says that the step-well was built in December 1499 AD. It was during the reign of Mahmud Shah that Bai Harir Sultani, locally known as Dhai Harir, built the step-well. The name later corrupted into Dada Hari. It costed 3,29,000 Mahmudis (₹ 3 lakh) at that time. The ornate step-well has spiral staircases pieced into the sidewall of the well shaft and descending to the different platform levels.

== Structure ==
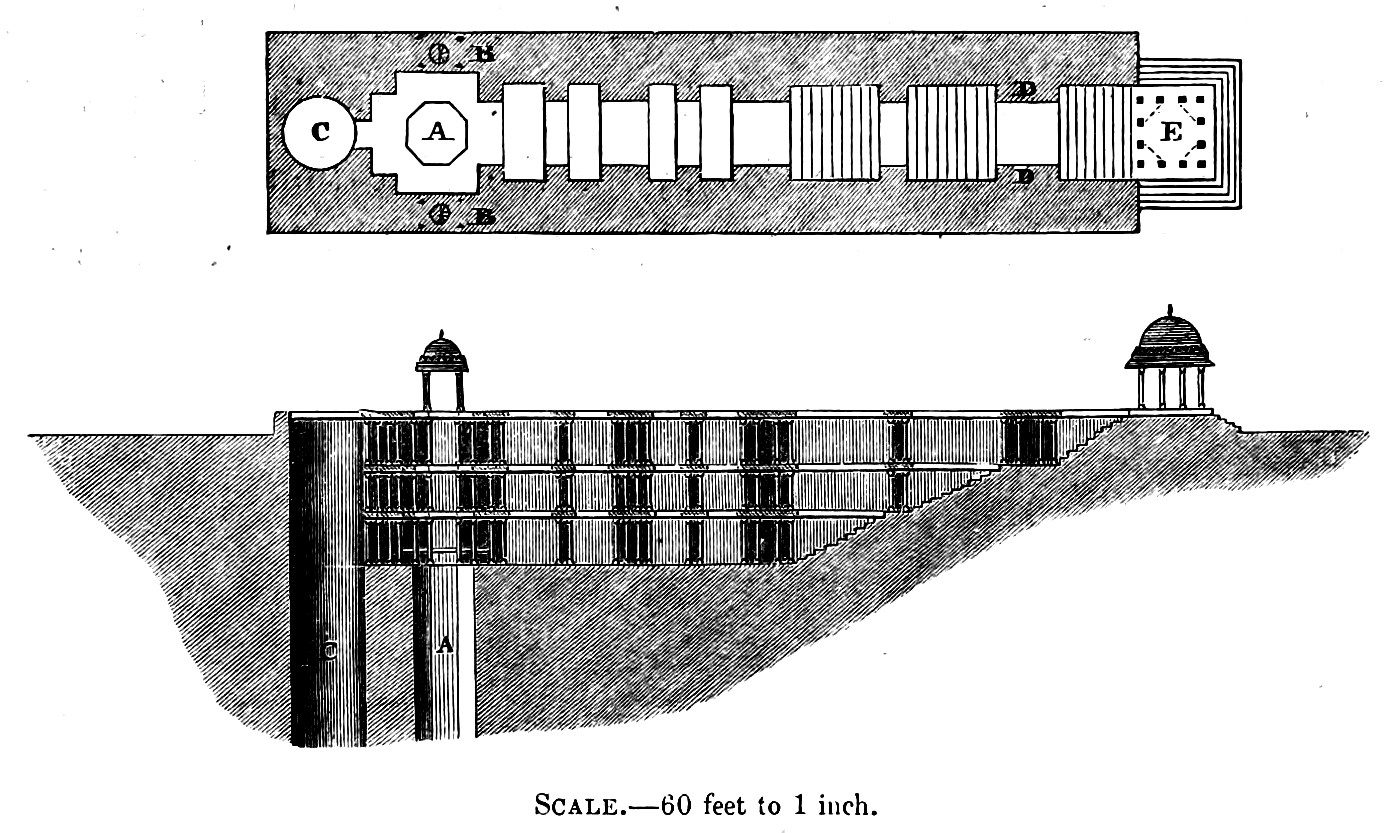
Plan of stepwell: A. Principal well, octagonal. B. Spire staircases descending to the water surface. C. Well for irrigation. D. Inscriptions on the sides of the gallery. E. Domed porch mounted by cupolas.

Built in sandstone in Solanki architectural style, the Dada Harir stepwell is five stories deep. The well is designed in five levels, the east level being octagonal in shape. Each level is provided with finely sculptured pillars and volute capitals. The niches are full of finely sculptured stone work and parapets of kumbha or geometric friezes. The builder has also provided stone ledges for people to take rest. Each stair also contains a square domed kiosk with an overhanging chajja (cover of a roof). The pillars and platforms rise vertically one on top of the other. The steps are open to the sky, whereas the kutas (landings) are closed with stone slabs. The well shaft is circular. There are passage ways at all levels which connect the shaft to the octagonal space above the tank. The shaft wall is covered with geometric designs. From the first story level, three staircases lead to the bottom water level of the well, which is considered a unique feature.

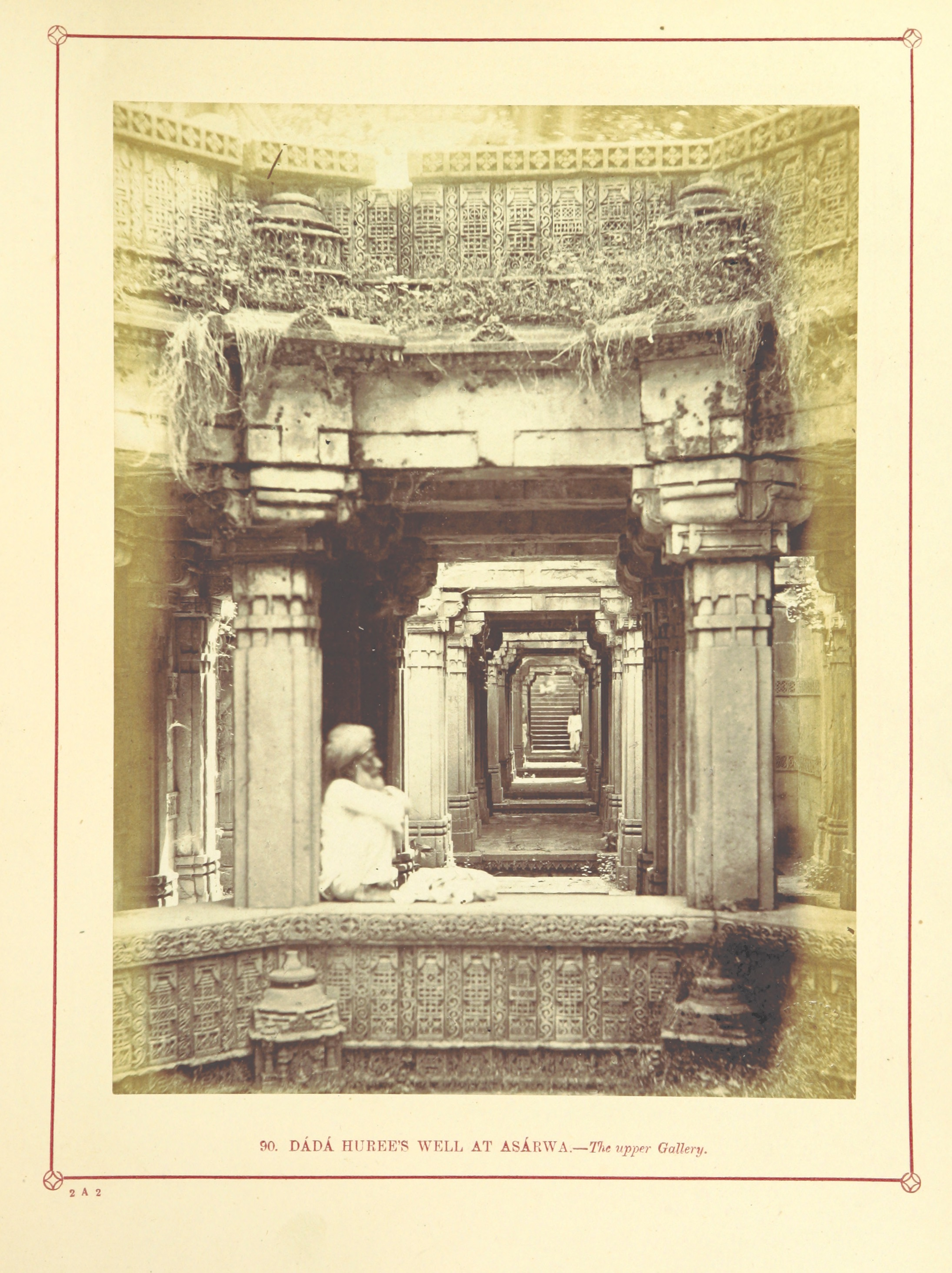
The upper gallery

At the level of the ground, it is 190 feet long by forty wide. At the east end, from a domed canopy, a descent of eight steps leads to a covered gallery. A second flight of nine steps leads to another gallery, and a third of eight steps to the lowest gallery two or three foot above the level of the water. At each landing a corridor runs along the sides and leads to other galleries that cross the well at intervals.

Built along an east–west axis, entrance is from the East, the two spiral staircases are in West, near the well. The structural system is typically Indian style with traditional trabeate with horizontal beams and lintels. At the bottom of the well is a square stepped floor in the shape of a funnel extending to the lowest plane. This is chiseled into a circular well. Above the square floor, columns, beams, wall and arched openings spiral around; a feature that continues to the top. The top part of the well, however, is a vertical space open to the sky. The four corners of the square are strengthened with stone beams, set at 45 degrees angle. The motifs of flowers and graphics of Islamic architecture blend very well. The dominant carvings on the upper floors are of elephants (3 inches (76 mm) in size, each of a different design).

== Gallery ==
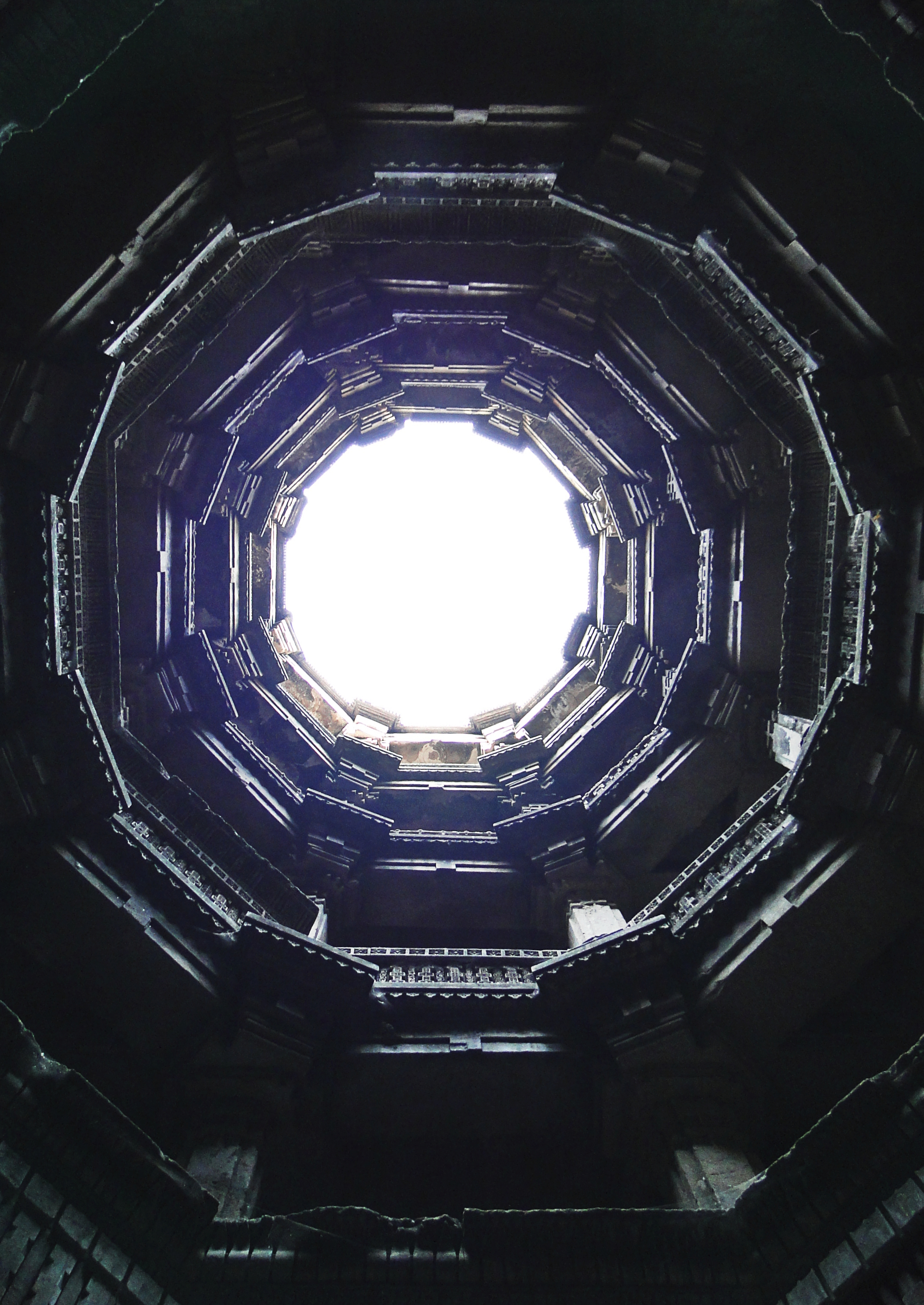
Looking up from the lowest level of the step well.

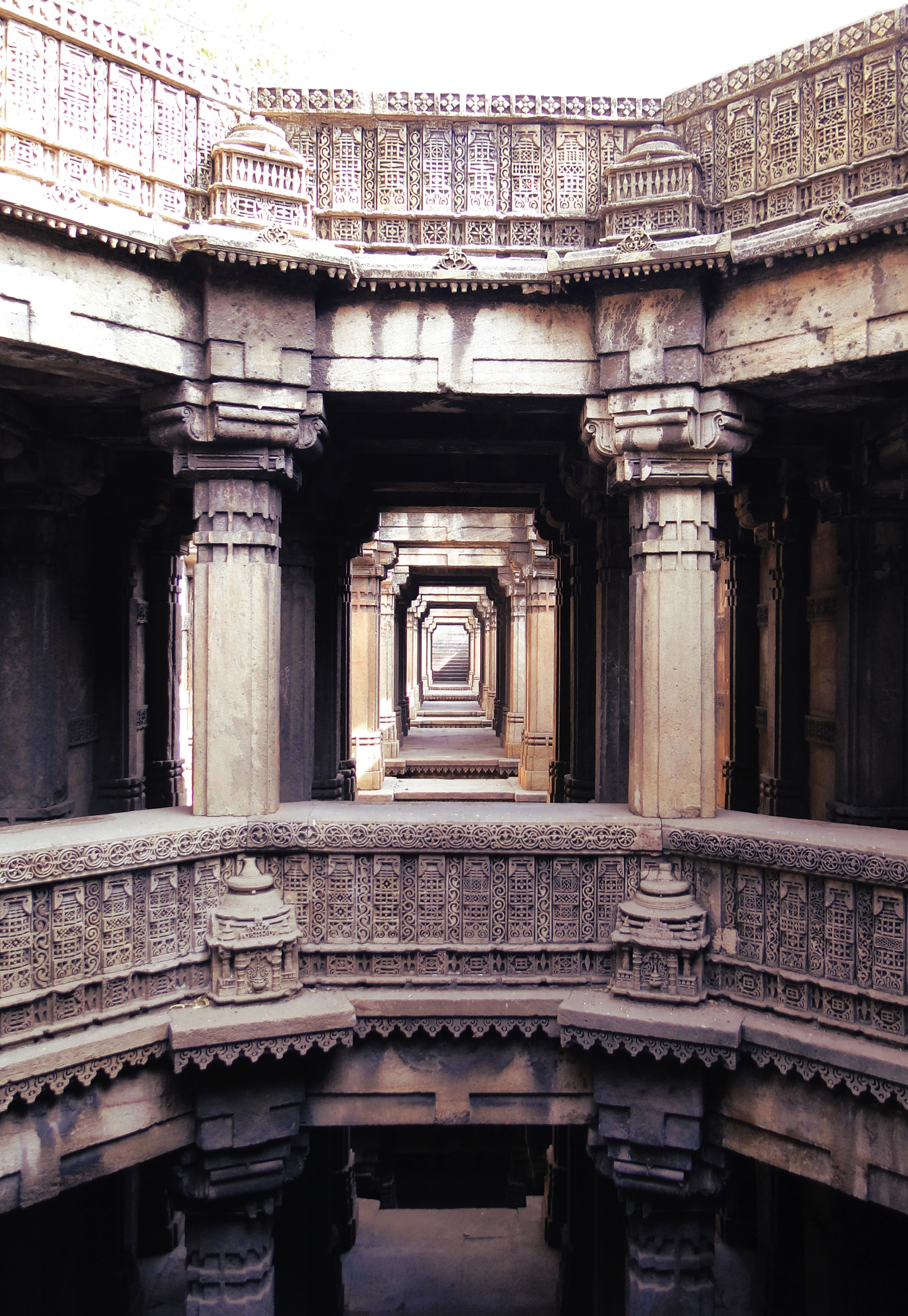

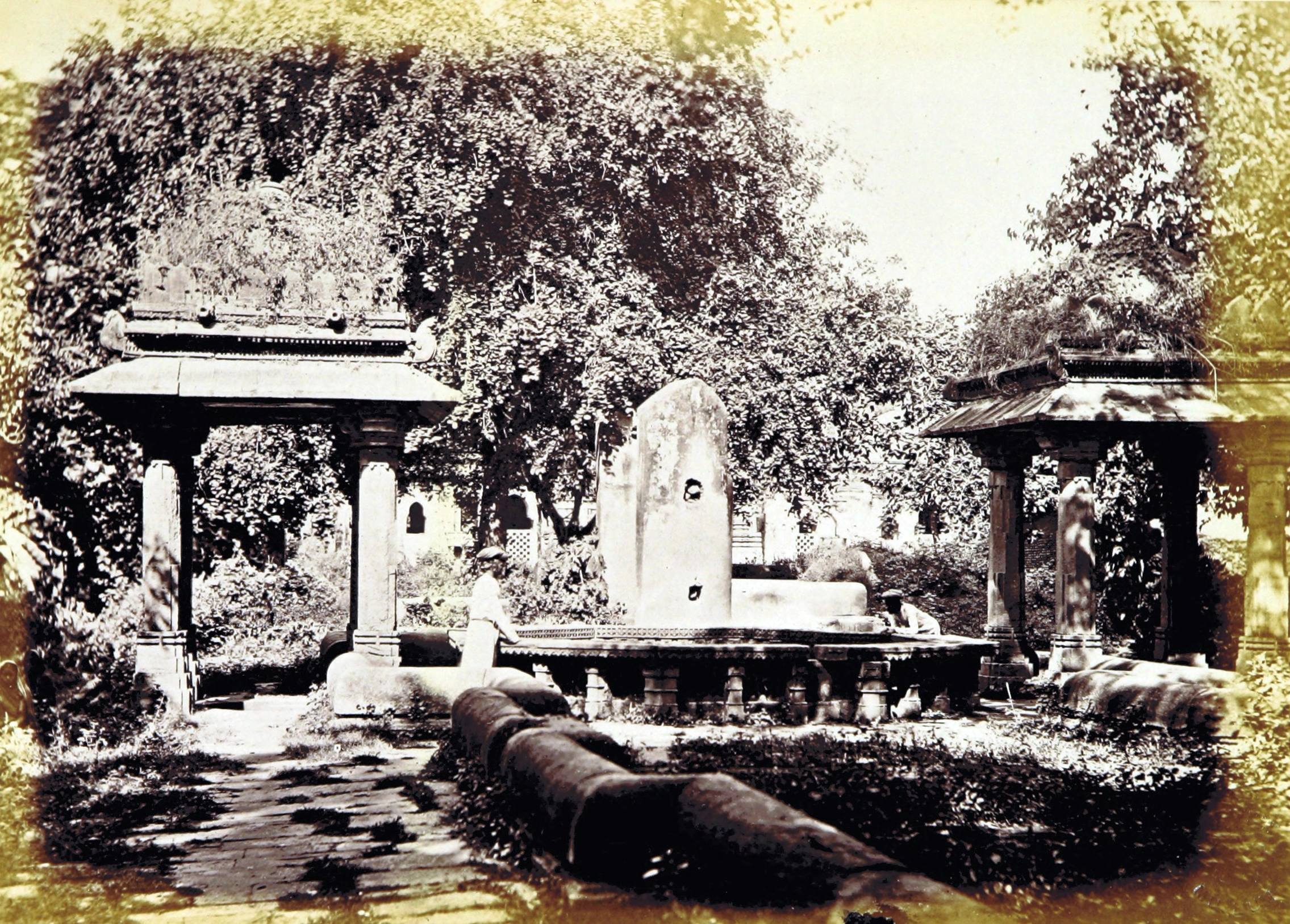
Cupola over staircases, 1866

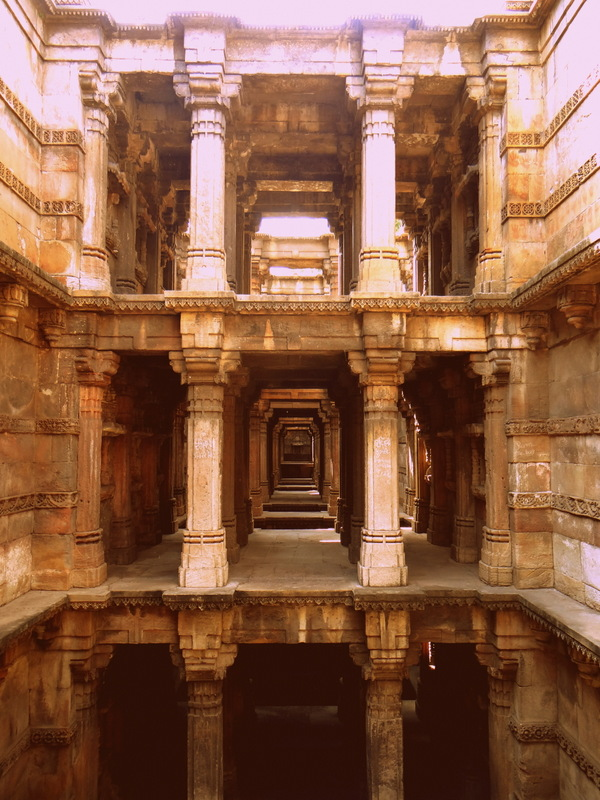

== See also ==
- Mata Bhavani's Stepwell
- Amritavarshini Vav
- Adalaj Stepwell
- Jethabhai's Stepwell
- Ahmedabad
