= Adalaj Stepwell =

Stepwell in Gujarat, India

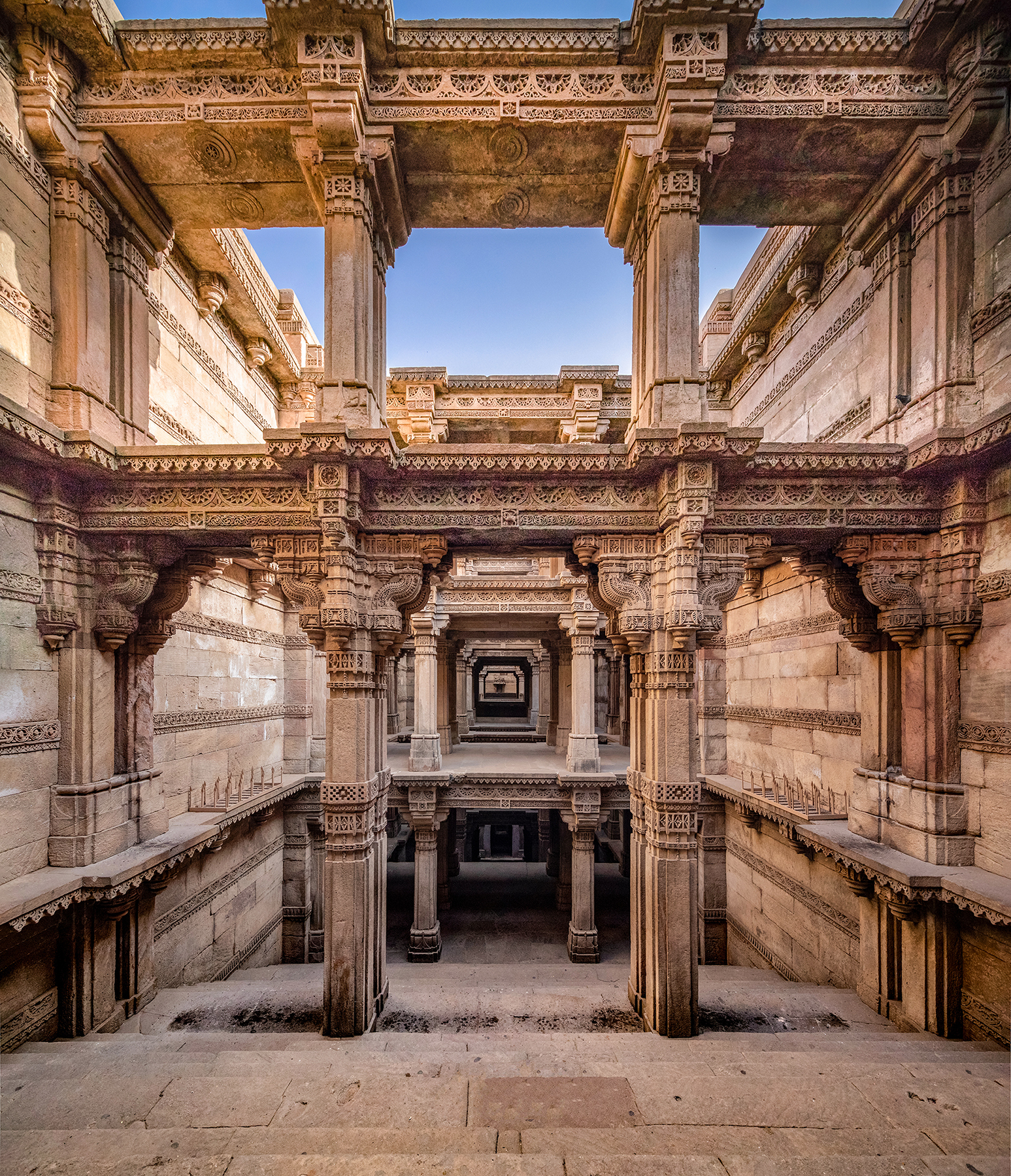
- Interior

General information
- Architectural style: Hindu and architecture
- Location: Gandhinagar, India
- Coordinates: 23.16691°N 72.58024°E
- Construction started: 1499
- Completed: 16 January 1499

Technical details
- Size: Five storeyed deep well

Design and construction
- Architect: Local

Adalaj Stepwell or Rudabai Stepwell is a stepwell located in the small town of Adalaj, close to Gandhinagar capital of Indian state Gujarat. It was built in 1498 in the memory of Rana Veer Singh of the Vaghela dynasty. The stepwell is built from sandstone in the Solanki architectural style.

== Stepwell ==
While in Gujarati and Marwari language, the stepwell is called a vav (leading down to the level of water), in other Hindi-speaking regions of North India, it is known as a baoli (also spelt, 'bawdi', 'bawri' and 'bavadi').

Stepwells like the one in Adalaj were once integral to the semi-arid regions of Gujarat, as they provided water for drinking, washing, and bathing. These wells were also venues for colorful festivals and sacred rituals.

Stepwells, also called stepped ponds and built between the 5th and 19th centuries, are common in Western India; over 120 such wells are reported in the semi-arid region of Gujarat alone, of which the well at Adalaj is one of the most popular. Stepwells are also found in more arid regions of the Indian subcontinent, extending into Pakistan where they collect rainwater during seasonal monsoons. While many such structures are utilitarian in construction, they sometimes include significant architectural embellishments, as in the Adalaj stepwell, which attracts many tourists. In the past, these stepwells were frequented by travelers and caravans as stopovers along trade routes.

India's first rock-cut stepwells are dated from 200–400 AD. Subsequently, the wells at Dhank (550–625) and construction of stepped ponds at Bhinmal (850–950) took place.

The city of Mohenjo-daro has wells, which may be the predecessor of the step well; as many as 700 wells have been discovered in just one section of the city, leading scholars to believe that cylindrical brick lined wells were invented by the people of the Indus Valley civilization. Between third and second millennium BC, at the "Great Bath", at the site of Mohenjodaro of the Harappan civilization, filling of water was achieved from a large well located in one of the rooms in front of the open courtyard of the building–complex.

While early stepwells were made of stone, later stepwells were made of mortar, stucco, rubble, and laminar stones. The well cylinder was the basic structure used to deepen the wells. It is also inferred that the stepwells in Gujarat have survived so long because of the builder's knowledge of the soil conditions and the earthquake proneness of the region.

The well size recommended, based on considerations of stability, was of four to thirteen hasta ('hasta' a Sanskrit word meaning "forearm" of size varying from 12–24 inches (300–610 mm)), A size of eight hasta was considered ideal, and a 13 hasta well was considered dangerous. However, the well thickness from top to bottom remained generally uniform. By the 11th century, the stepwell planning and design acquired architectural excellence and the Hindu Stepwells were standardized.

== History ==
The Adalaj stepwell or 'Vav', as it is called in Gujarati, is intricately carved and is five storeys deep. It was built in 1498. An inscription in Sanskrit establishes the history of the Adalaj stepwell found on a marble slab positioned in a recess on the first floor, from the eastern entry to the well. It is in the typical style of the Gujarat sultanate, built in 1499 in the reign of Mahmud Begada.

The Sanskrit inscription in the stepwell describes:

"Samvat 1555 (1498 AD), month of Magha, Mahmud Padshah being king.

"Salutation to Vinayaka (Ganesha) to whose race belonged King Mokala, chief of the country of Dandahi. From him was born Karna, whose son was Mularaja. Mahipa was Mularaja's son, and Virsinh and Naisha were the sons of Mahipa. Virsinh's queen, whose name is Rooda, has constructed this well.

"It is dedicated at this time – when the sun is in the north, the month is Magha, the bright half (Shukla Paksha), the 5th day, the day of the week, Wednesday, the lunar mansion – Uttara, Karana-Bava, the yoga – Siddhi."

Then follows a glowing description of the well, after which the queen, or rather lady of the chief, is praised in a few verses; the expense is stated at 5,00,111 tankas or over five lakhs, and the whole ends with a repetition of the date as given above.

The inscription on the stepwell reads:

"On the fifth day of the month of Māgha in the Saṁvat year 1555 the king Pādasāha Śrī Mahimūda.

"Oṁ. Salutation to Vināyaka: Salutation! In whose family was Mokalasiṁha the sovereign king of Daṇḍāhideśa, a Vāghela, equal to Indra in power, who protected the assembly of Bhāgavatas;
...

"Hail! While the year 1555 of the era of the king Vikrama and 1420 of the Śaka was current, in the Āṣāḍha month and Śiśara season of the Uttarāyana, on Wednesday the fifth of the light fortnight of Māgha in the nakṣatra of Uttarābhādrapadā in the Yoga called Siddhi and in the Karaṇa named Bava, the moon being in the Mīnarāśī (Pisces), in the victorious reign of Pātasāha Śrī Mahamūda, the queen Rūḍābāī, the faithful wife of Virasiṁha – Mahīpa's son, the lord of the country of Daṇḍāhi, a Vāghela, the crest-gem of all kings – made a well at Aḍālij for the benefit of all. The overseer was Mahaṁ, the son of Bhīma of the Śrīmālī caste. The money spent in building the well was 500,111 or in round figures 5 lākhs only. May his continue firm during the existence of the Sun and Moon!"

The cultural and architectural depiction in the deep wells at various levels are a tribute to the history of step wells, built by Hindus.

== Legend ==
As per legend, in the 15th century, Rana Veer Singh of the Vaghela dynasty, a Hindu ruler, reigned over this territory known as Dandai Desh. His kingdom was a small one. It was subject to water shortage and was highly dependent on the rains. To alleviate the misery of his people, the Rana began the construction of a large and deep stepwell.

Before this project could be completed, his kingdom was attacked by Mohammed Begda, the Muslim ruler of a neighboring kingdom. The Rana king was killed in battle, and Mohammed Begda occupied his territory. Rana Veer Singh's widow, a beautiful lady, known as Rani Roopba (or Roodabai), wanted to commit suicide and join her husband in the afterlife. However, Begada prevented her from giving up her own life and proposed marriage with the dowager.

She agreed to a marriage proposal on the condition that he would first complete the building of the stepwell. The Muslim king, who was deeply enamored of the queen's beauty, agreed to the proposal and built the well in record time. Once the well was completed, Begda reminded the queen of her promise to marry him. Instead, the queen who had achieved her objective of completing the stepwell started by her husband decided to end her life. She circumambulated the stepwell with prayers and jumped into the well, ending the saga of building the well in tragedy.

One version, which is narrated in the 200 years old scriptures of the Swaminarayan sect, suggests that before she died, Rani Roopba requested religious saints to take a bath in this stepwell so that the water in the stepwell gets purified by these saints, thereby delivering her from her sins.

Another is linked to the tombs found near the well. The graves of six masons who built the well are seen near the Vav. Begda asked the Masons if they could make another similar well, and when they agreed, Begda sentenced them to death instead. Begda was so impressed by the architectural excellence of the stepwell that he did not want a replica to be built.

== Structure ==
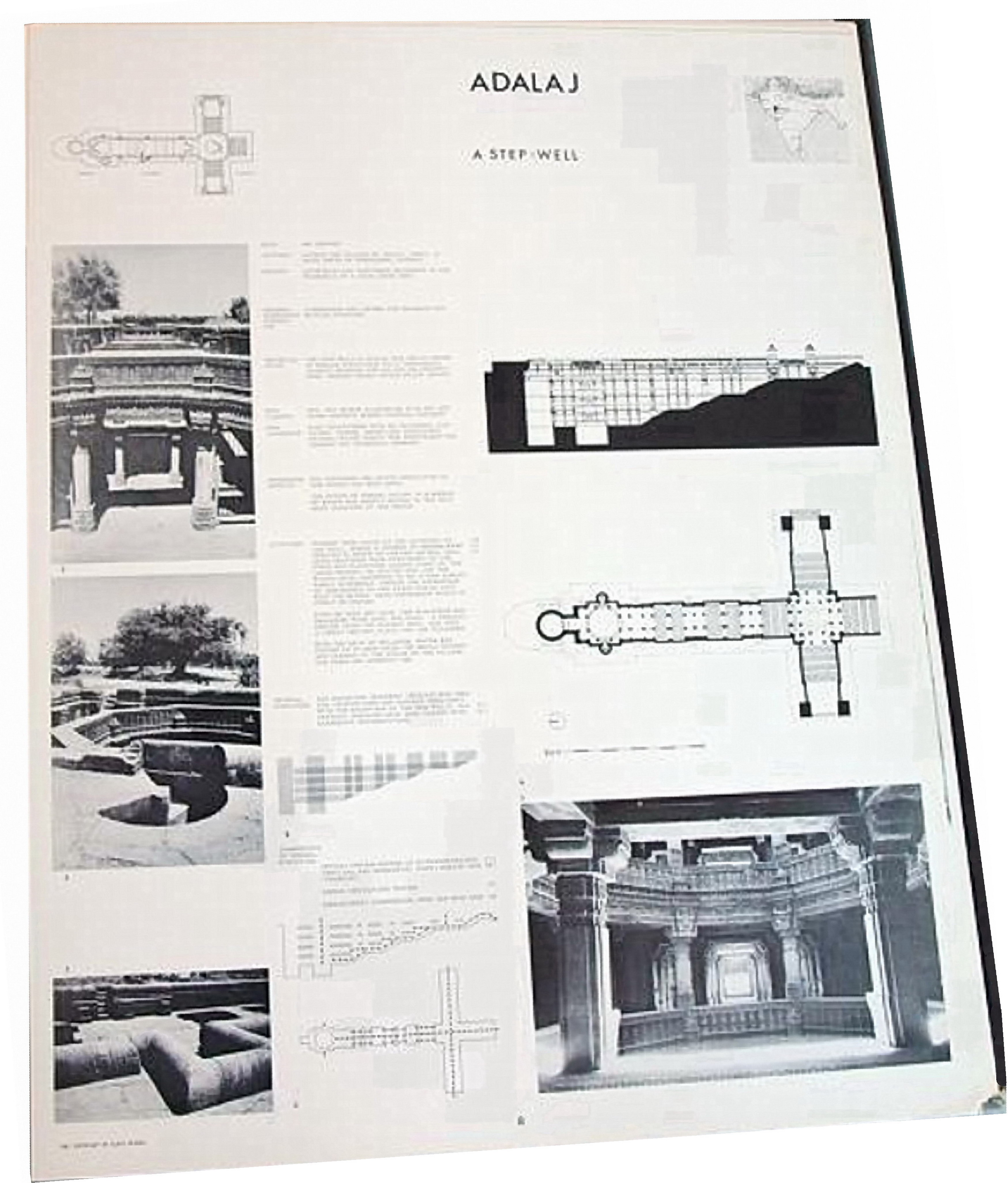
Photos and measurement drawings by Klaus Herdeg(1967) in: "Formal Structure in Indian Architecture"

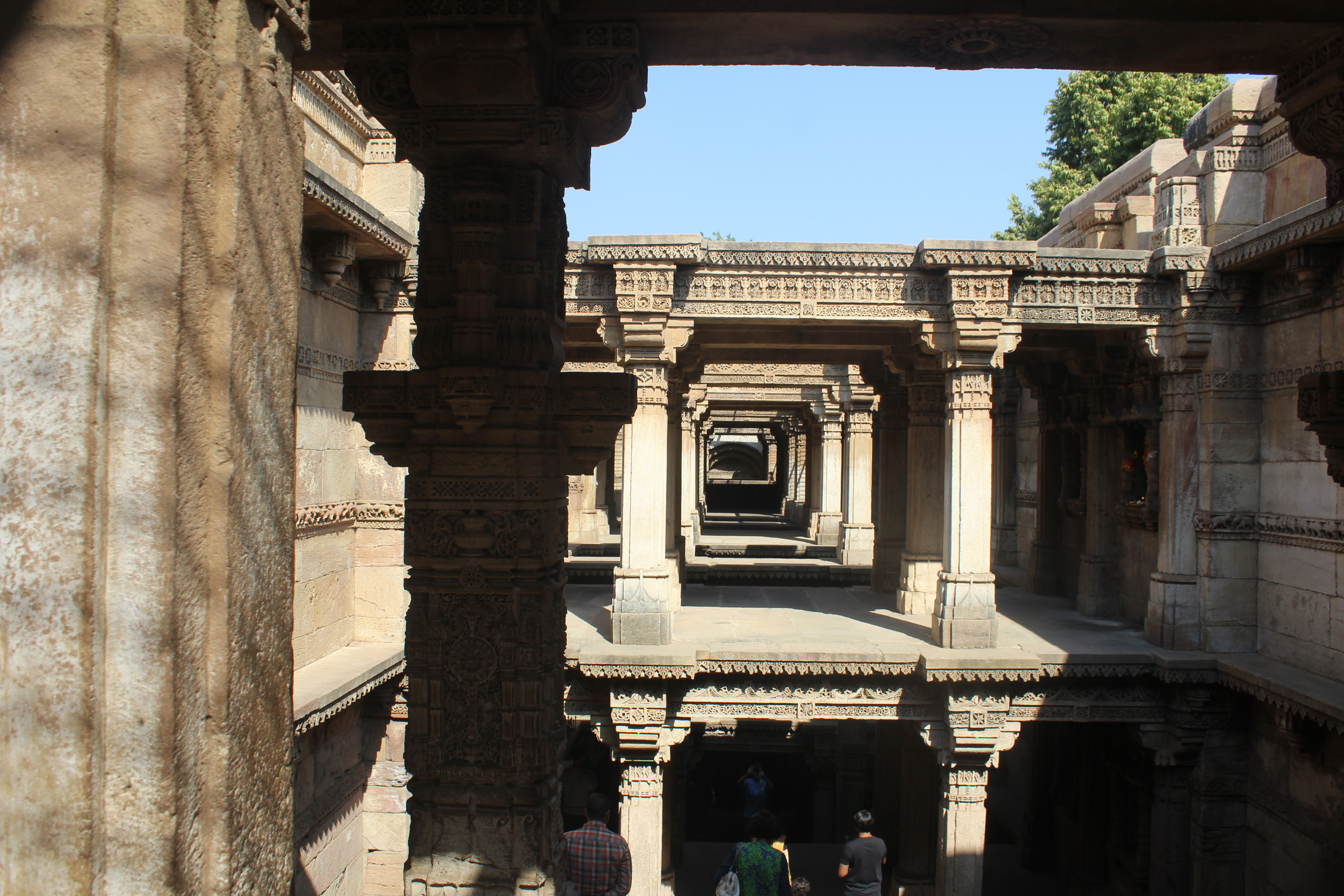
Adalaj Stepwell first floor

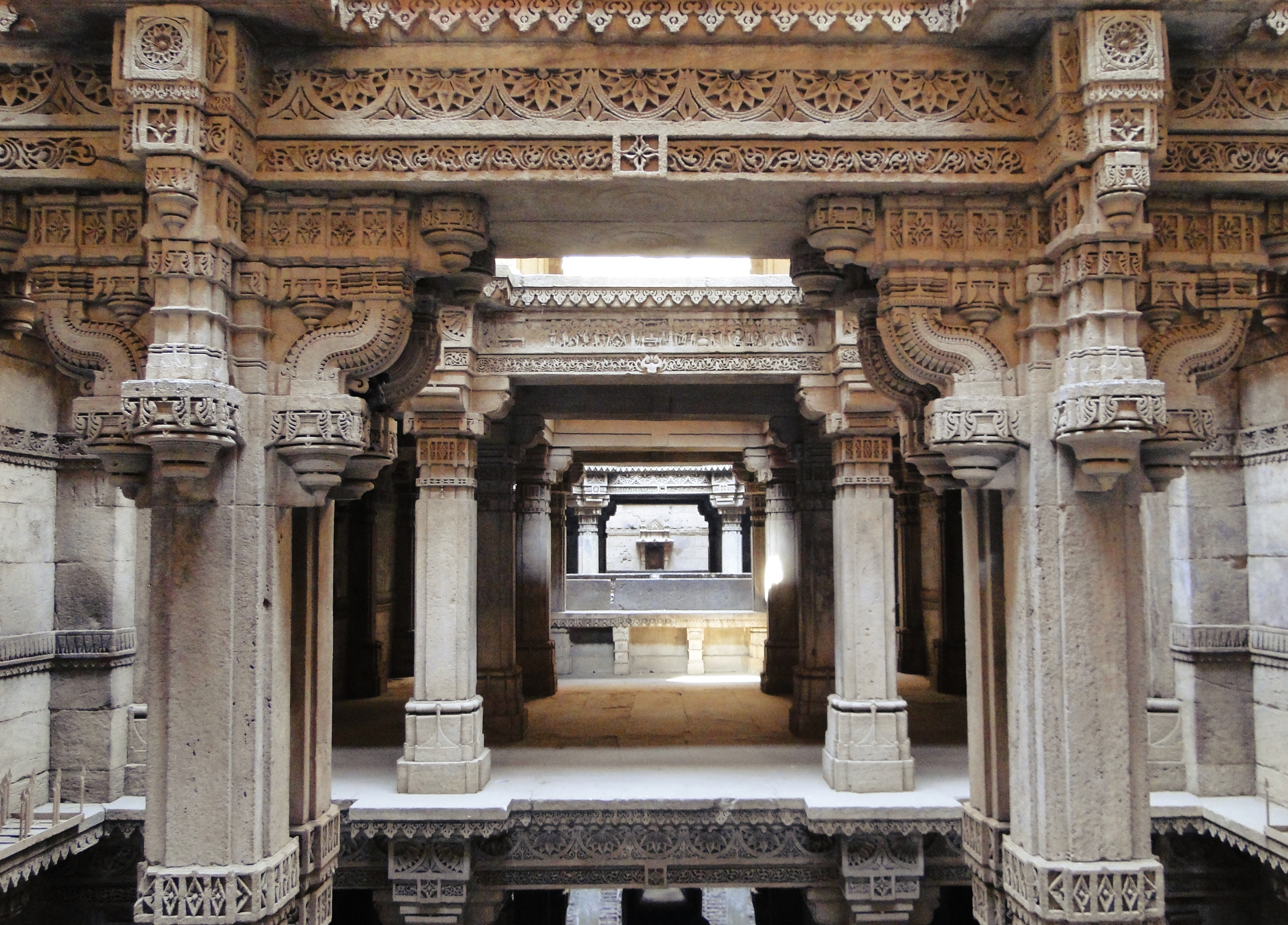
Upper storey.

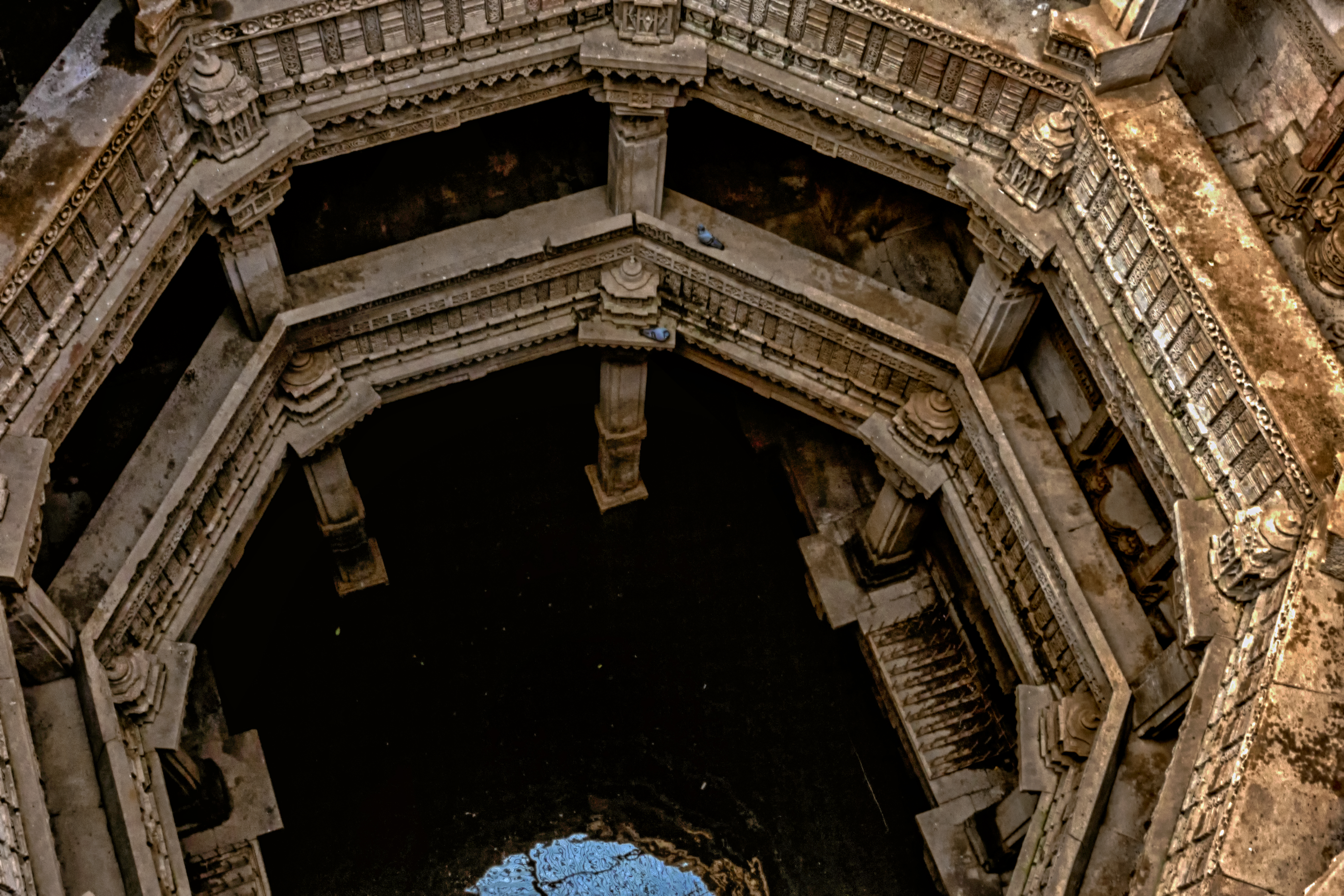
The step well is five storeys deep.

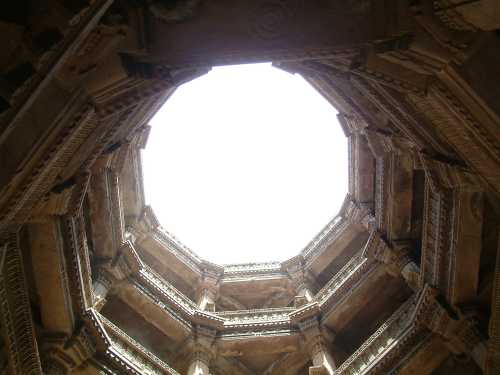
Looking up the well.

Built-in sandstone in the Solanki architectural style, the Adalaj stepwell is five storeys deep. It is octagonal in a plan at the top, built on an intricately carved large number of pillars. Each floor is spacious enough to provide for people to congregate. It was dug deep to access groundwater at that level, accounting for seasonal fluctuations in water level due to rainfall over the years. The air and light vents in the roofs at various floors and the landing level are in the form of large openings. From the first story level, three staircases lead to the bottom water level of the well, which is considered a unique feature. Built along a north-south axis, the entrance is from the south, and the three staircases are from the south, west, and east directions leading to the landing, which is on the northern side of the well. Four small rooms with oriel windows decorated with minutely carved brackets are provided at the landing level, at the four corners. The structural system is typically Indian with traditional trabeate with horizontal beams and lintels. At the bottom of the well is a square stepped floor in the shape of a funnel extending to the lowest plane. This is chiseled into a circular well. Above the square floor, columns, beams, walls, and arched openings spiral around, a feature that continues to the top. However, the top part of the well is a vertical space open to the sky. The four corners of the square are strengthened with stone beams, set at 45 degrees angle.

The motifs of flowers and graphics of architecture blend very well with the symbols of Hindu and Jain gods carved at various levels of the well. The dominant carvings on the upper floors are of elephants (3 inches (76 mm) in size, each of a different design). The walls are carved with women performing daily chores such as churning of buttermilk, adorning themselves, scenes of the performance of dancers and musicians, and the King overlooking all these activities.

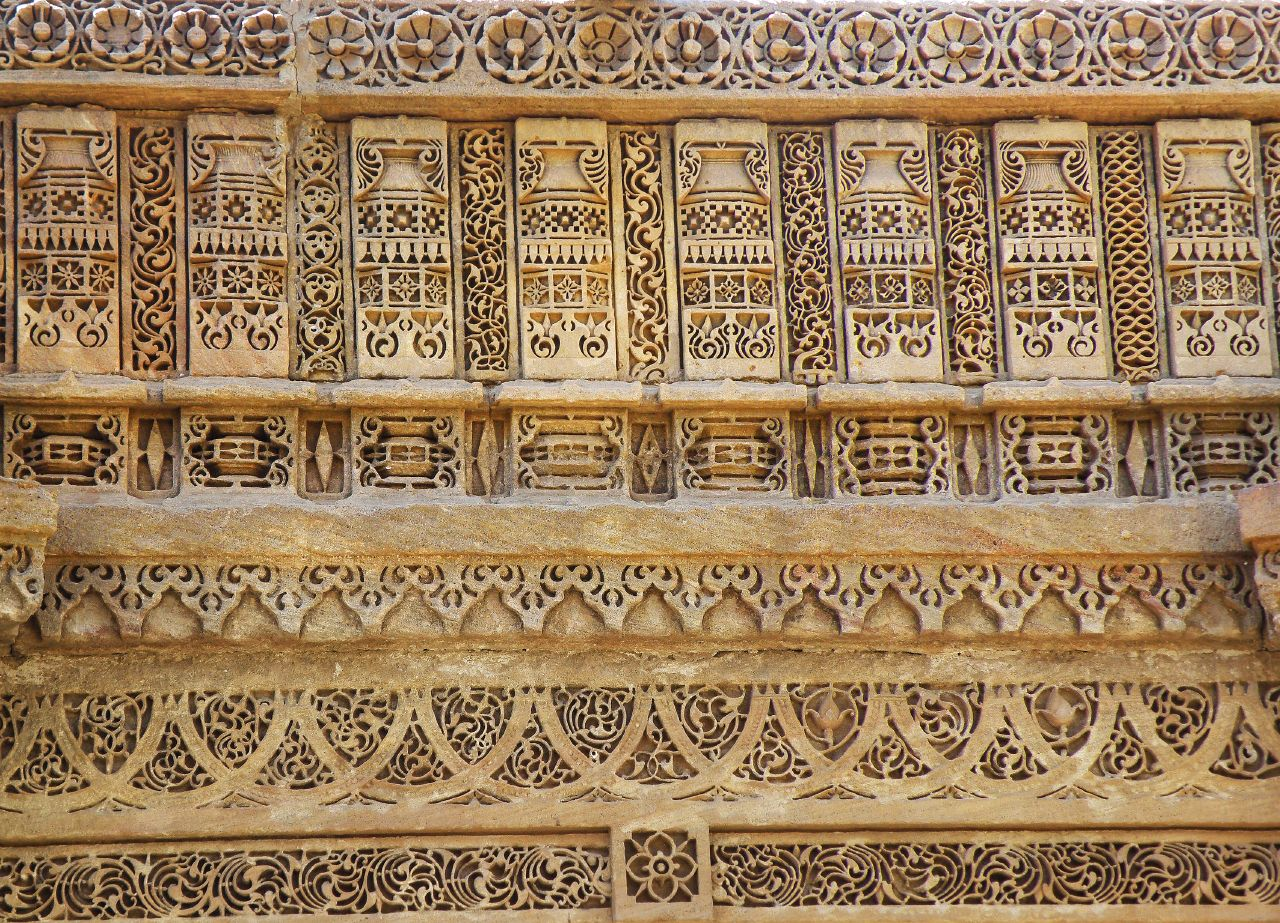
Intricate carving in the well structure

An interesting depiction carved from a single block of stone is of the Ami Khumbor (symbolic pot of the water of life) and the Kalp Vriksha (a tree of life). Also seen is a fresco of navagraha or nine planets. These depictions are said to attract villagers for worship during marriage and other ritualistic ceremonies.

The temperature inside the well is about five degrees lower than the outside hot summer temperatures. This encouraged the women who came to fetch water to spend more time in the cool climes here. They stayed to worship the gods and goddesses and gossip.

The rich underground structures, which are intricately decorated with sculptures, are said to resemble palaces.

== Access ==
The Adalaj stepwell is a popular tourist attraction of the Gandhinagar city and is situated 18 kilometres (11 mi) north of Ahmedabad city. It is 5 kilometres (3.1 mi) from Gandhinagar, the capital city of Gujarat.

Gandhinagar is the railway station closest to the stepwell.

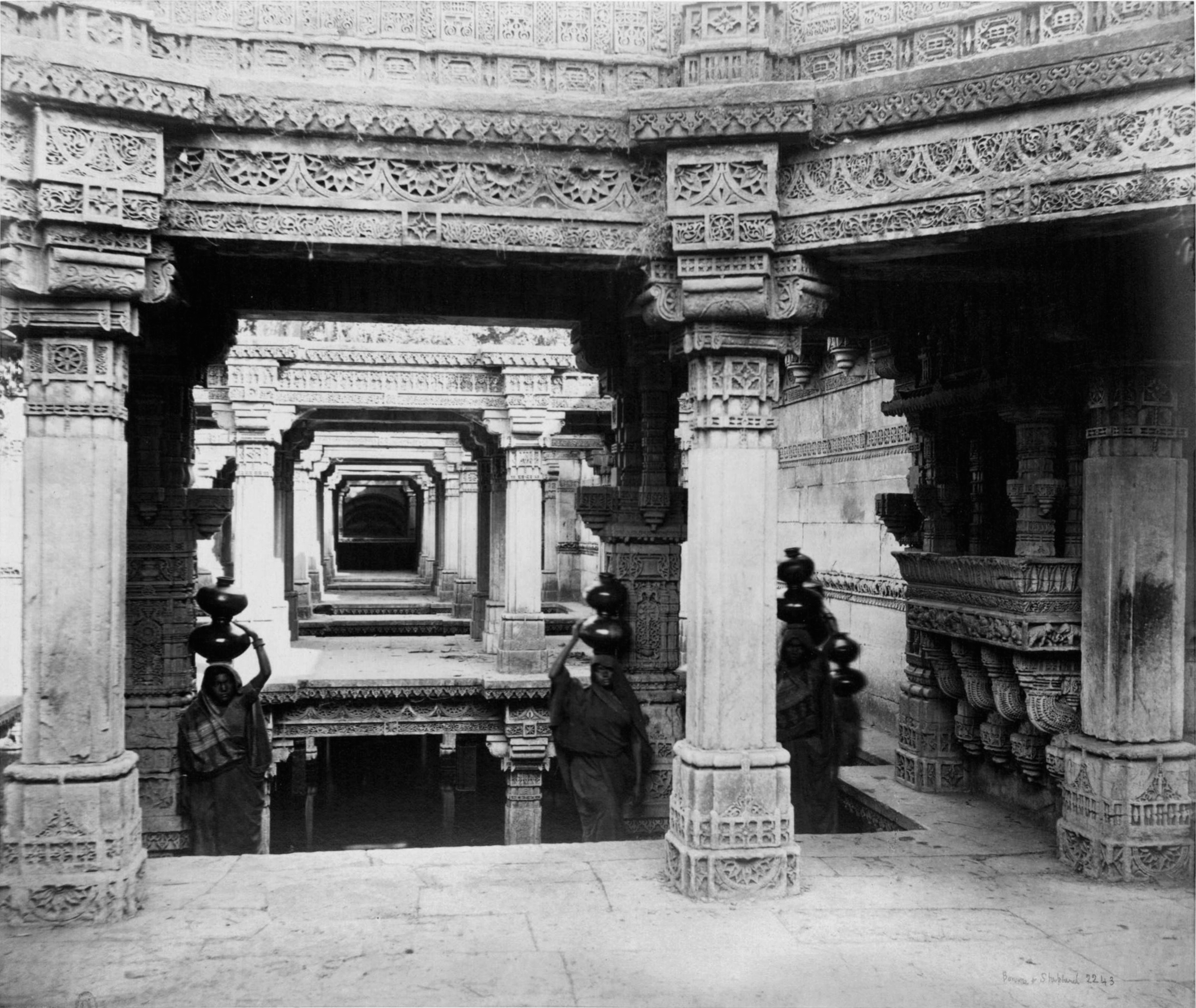
Women bringing water in the 1870s

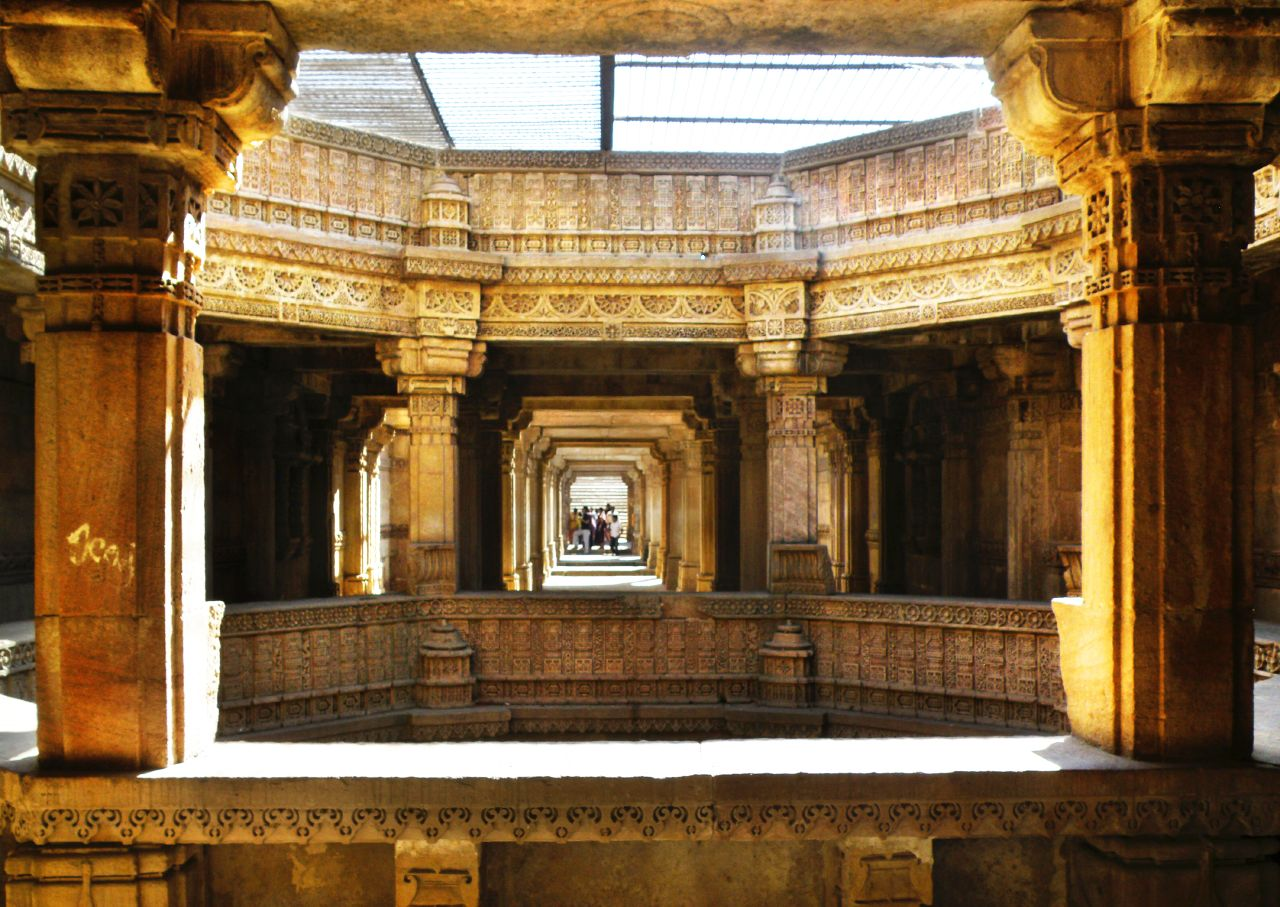

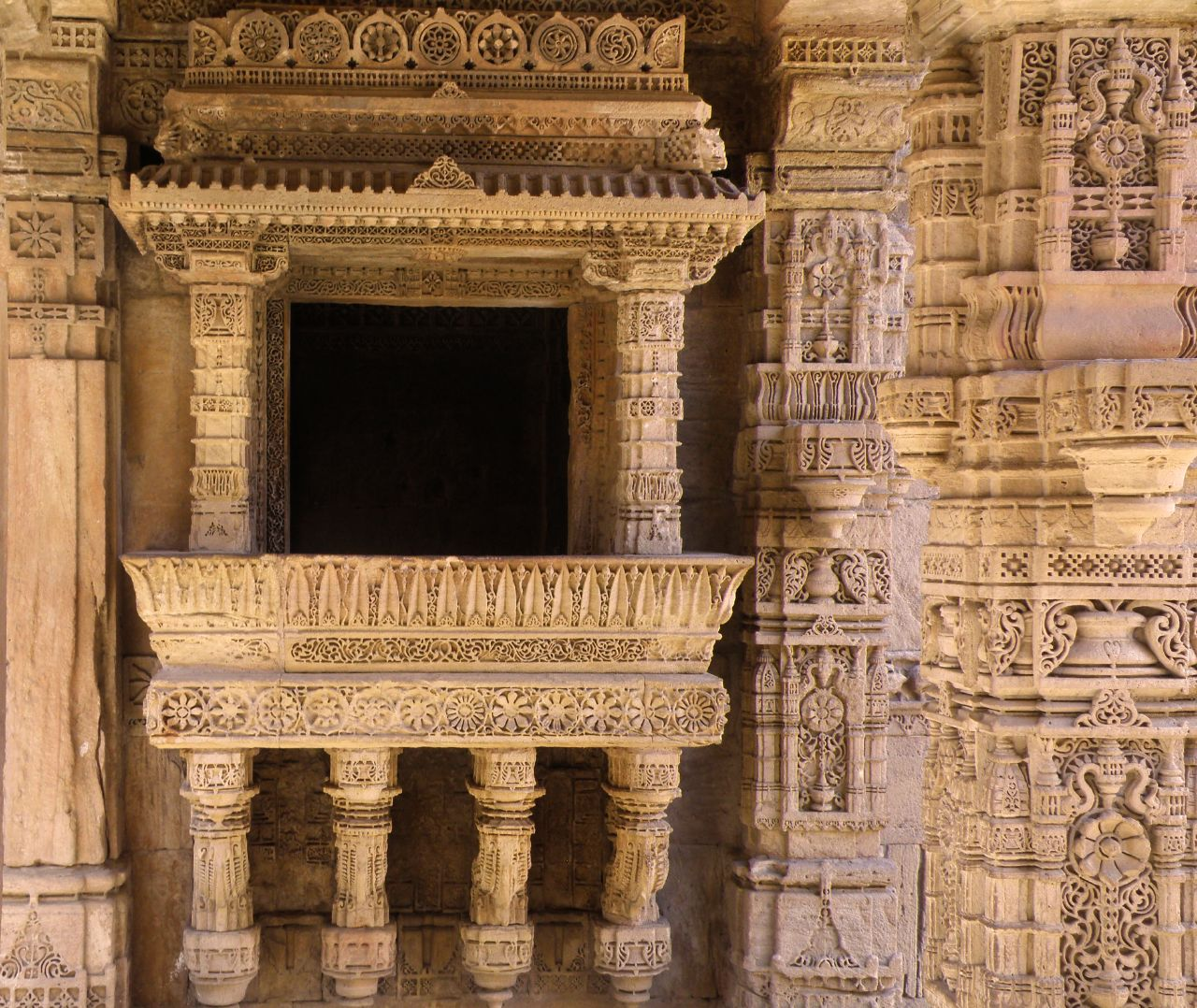

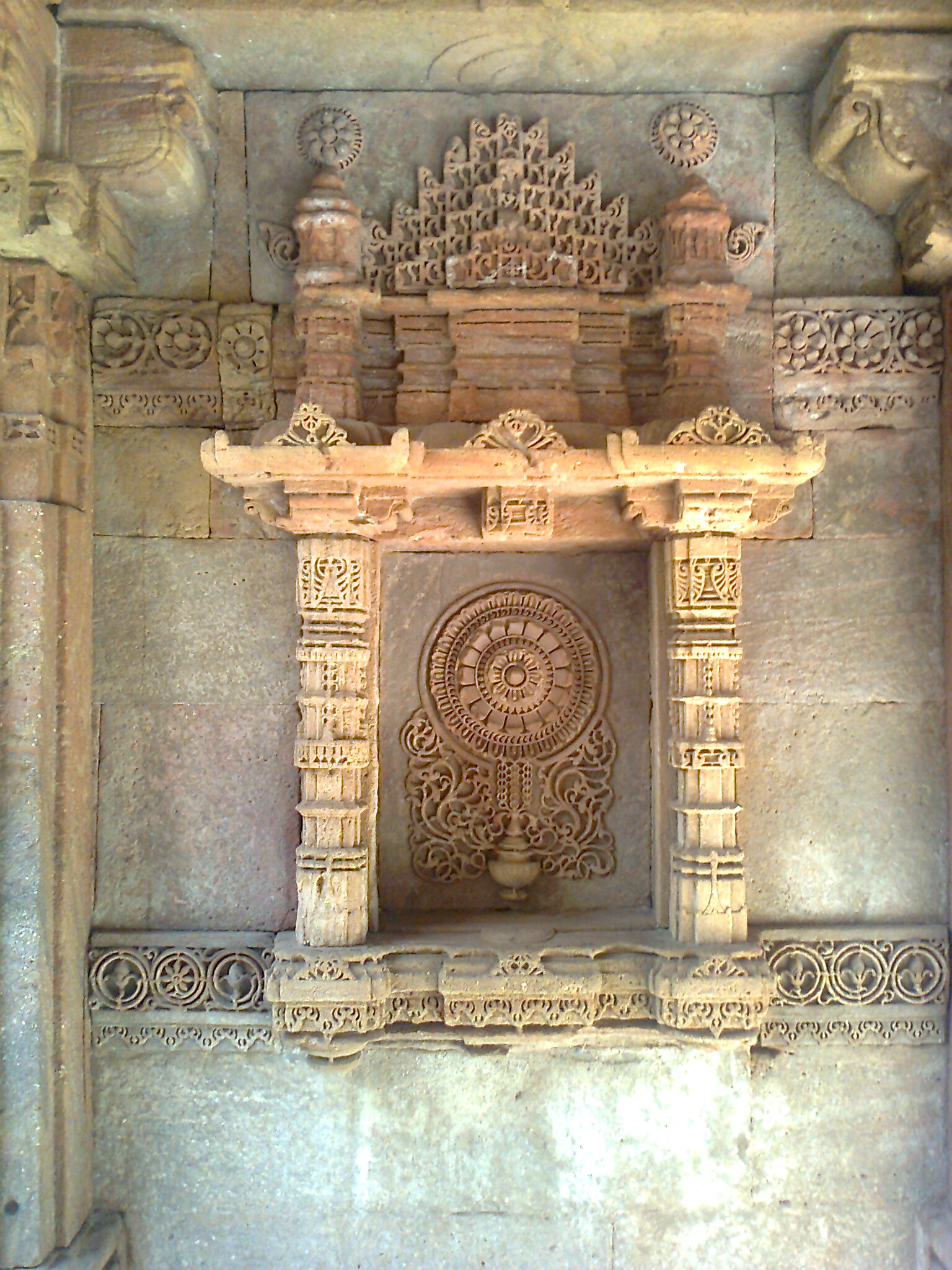

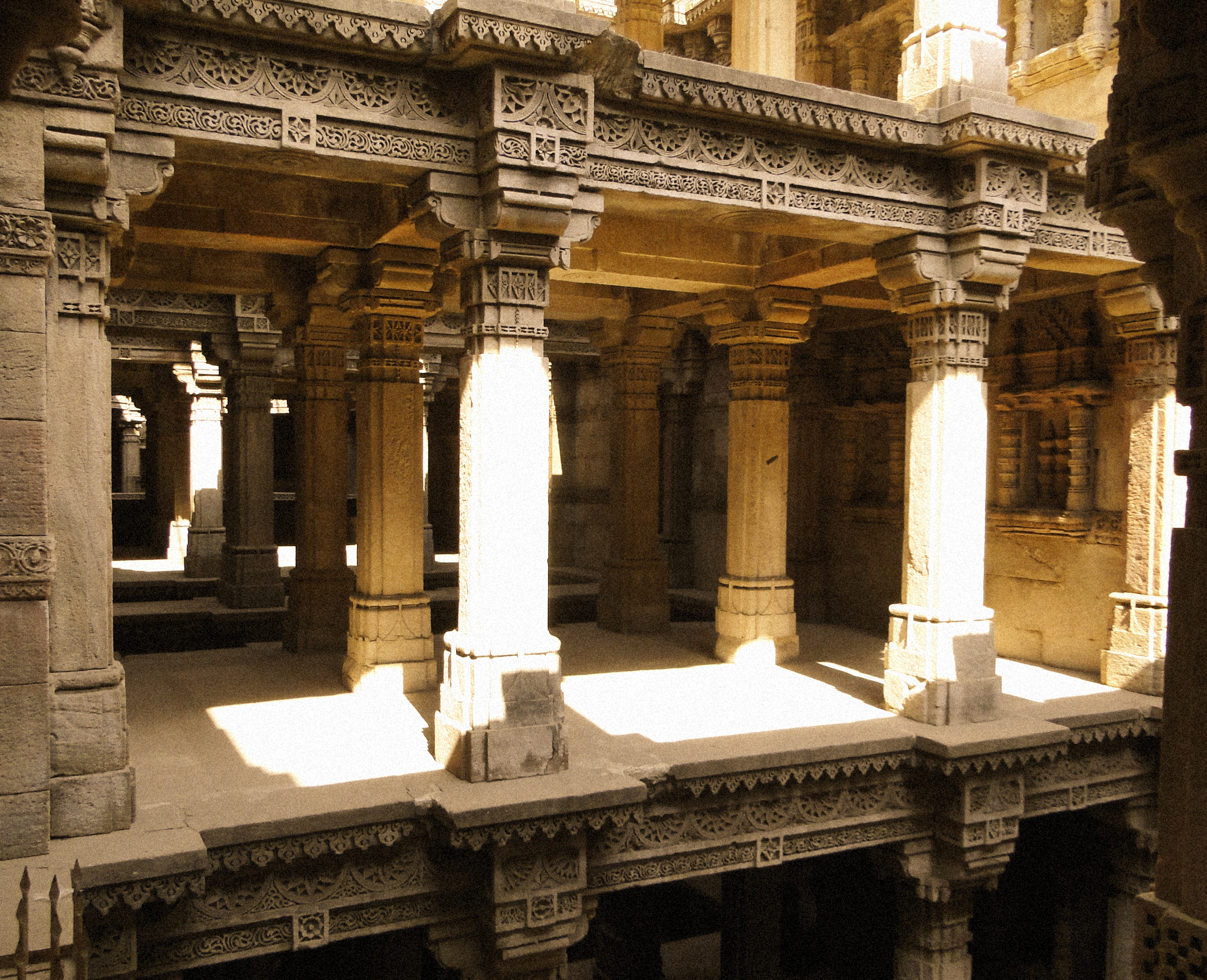
Upper storey of the stepwell.

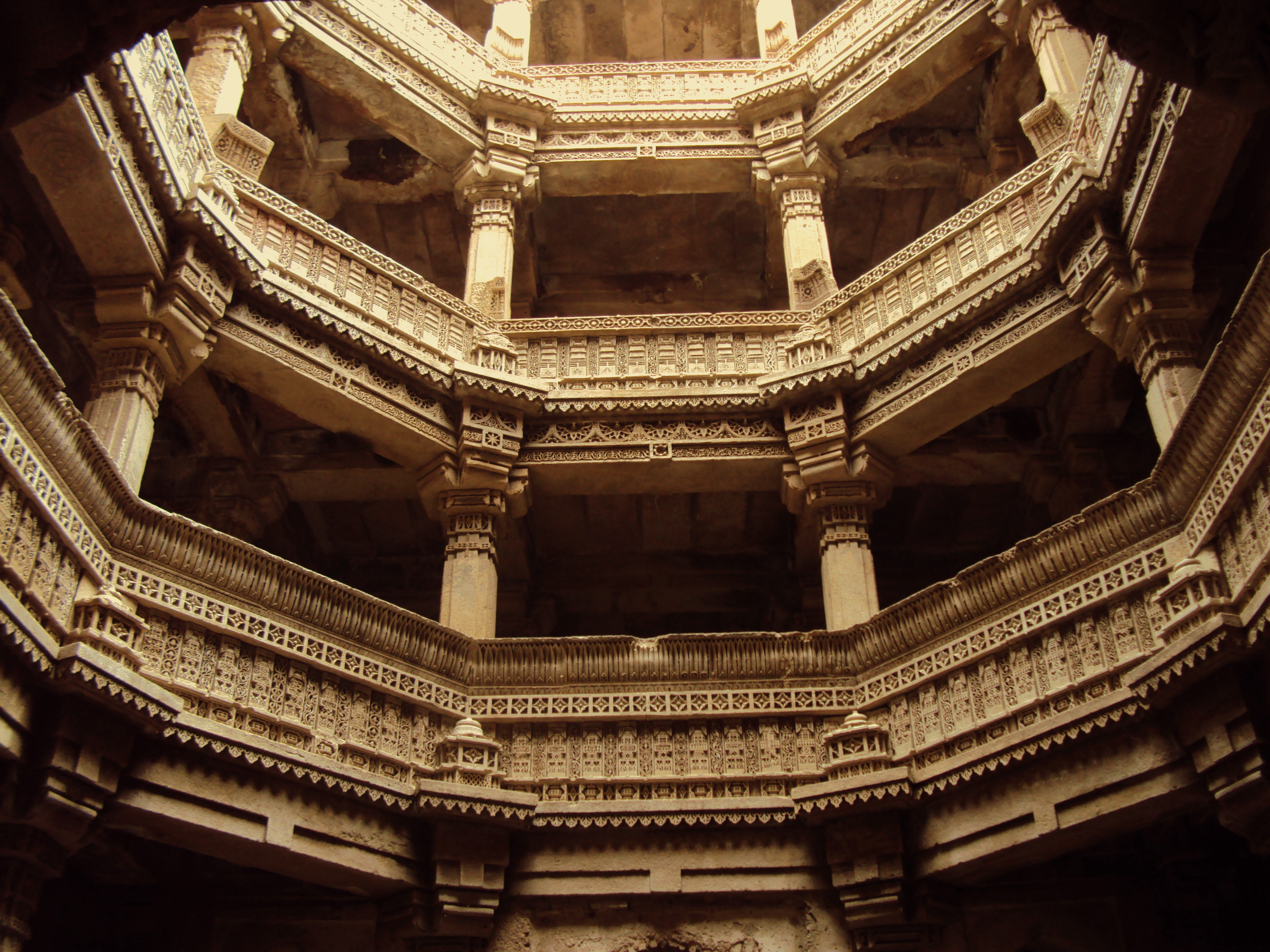
Adalaj stepwell

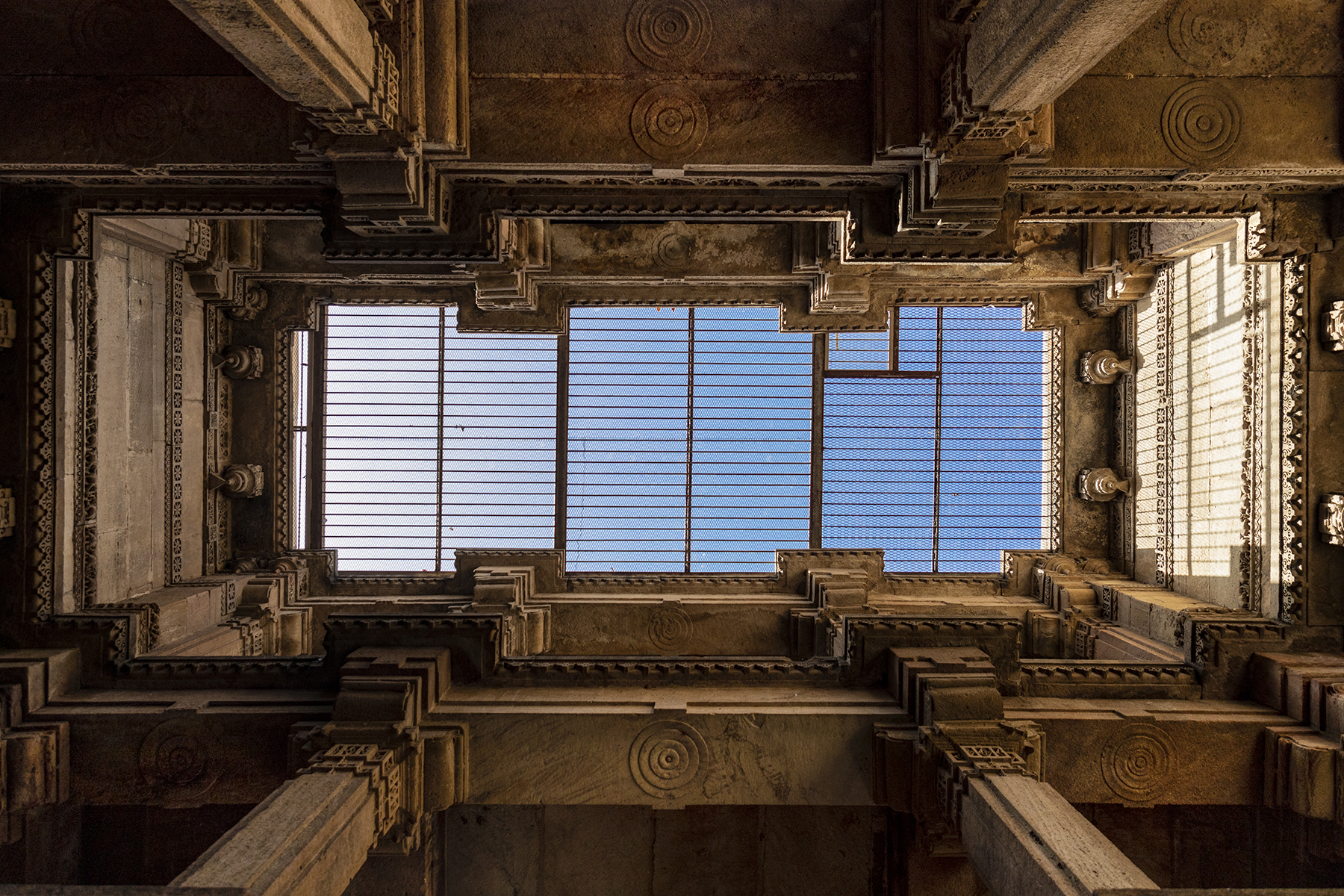
Ceiling on the well

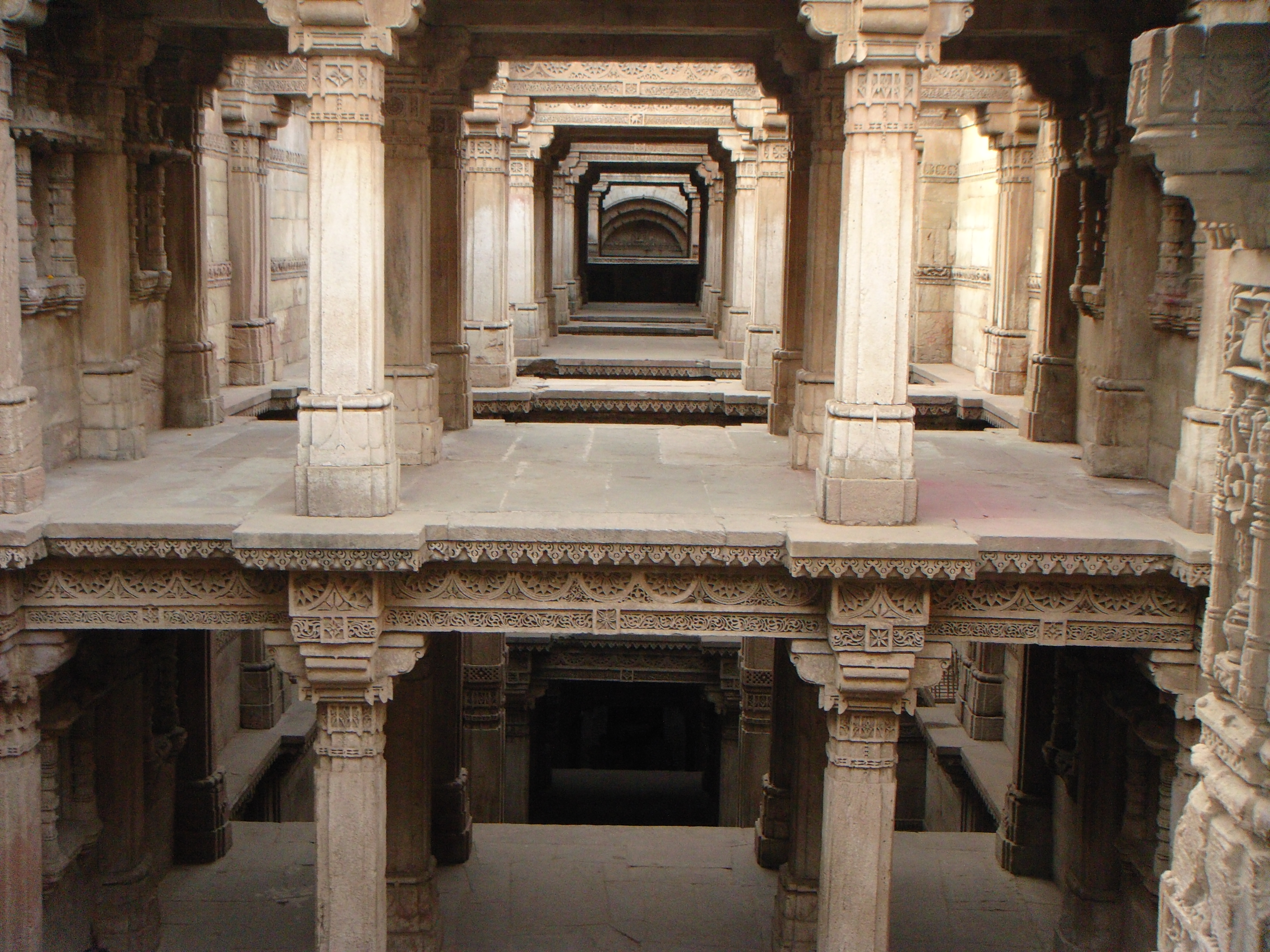

== See also ==
- Dada Harir Stepwell
- Mata Bhavani's Stepwell
- Amritavarshini Vav
- Jethabhai's Stepwell
- Ahmedabad
- Rani ki Vav

== Bibliography ==
- Klaus Herdeg, Balkrishna V. Doshi (preface): Formal Structure in Indian Architecture, Rizzoli, NY, 1991 ISBN 0-84781-048-8
- Livingston, Morna (2002). Steps to water: the ancient stepwells of India, p211, Princeton Architecture Press, ISBN 1-56898-324-7, ISBN 978-1-56898-324-0.
