= Mata Bhavani's Stepwell =

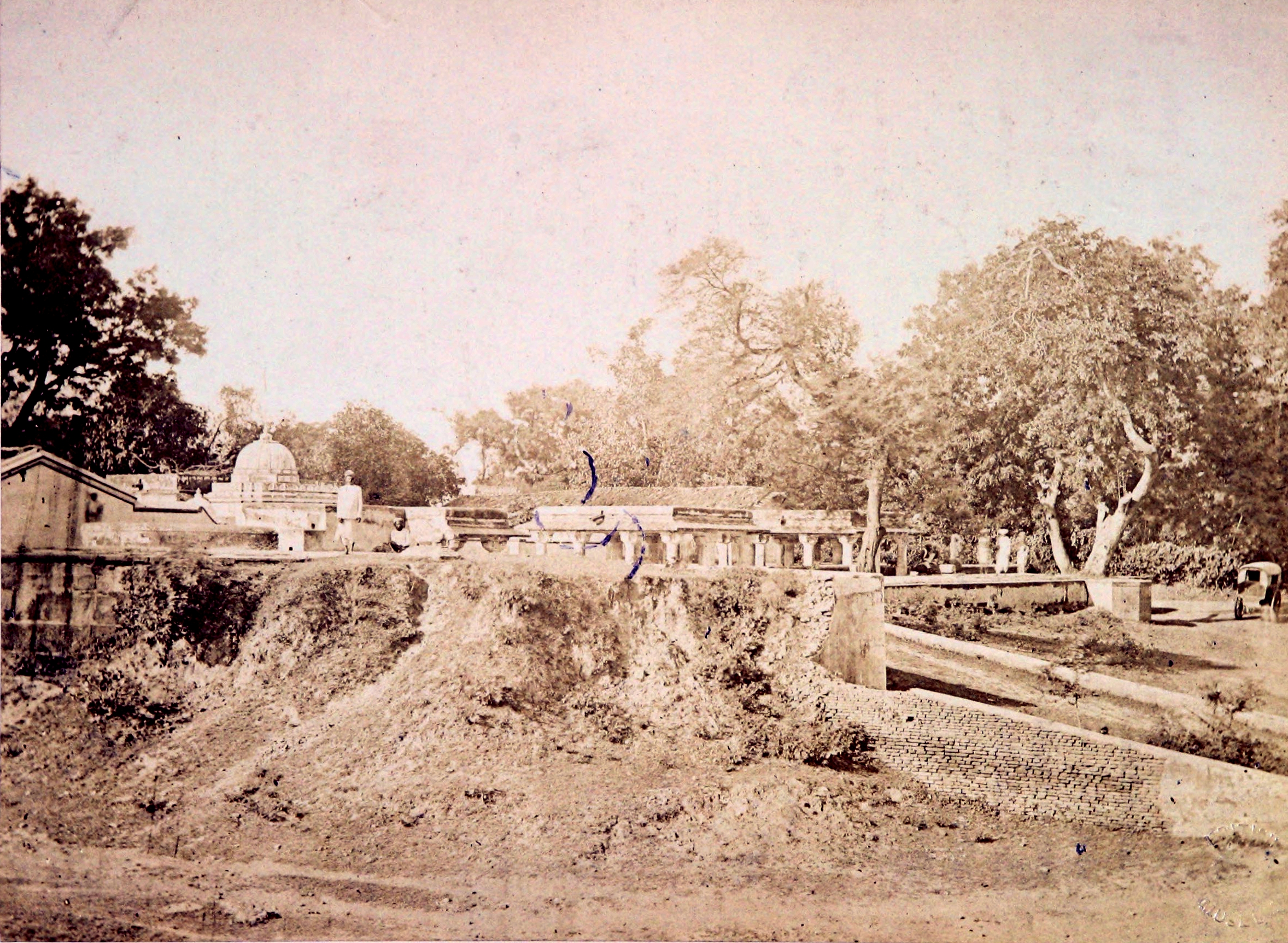
- Mata Bhavani's Stepwell, 1866

- Location in Ahmedabad, Gujarat, India Mata Bhavani's Stepwell (Gujarat)

Religion
- Status: Active

Location
- Location: Asarwa, Ahmedabad
- Municipality: Ahmedabad Municipal Corporation
- State: Gujarat
- Coordinates: 23.0443357°N 72.6068337°E

Architecture
- Type: stepwell

Mata Bhavani's Stepwell or Mata Bhavani ni Vav is a stepwell in Asarwa area of Ahmedabad, Gujarat, India.

== History and architecture ==
Mata Bhavani's stepwell was built in the 11th century during Chaulukya dynasty rule in Gujarat. It is one of the earliest existing examples of stepwells in India. A long flight of steps leads to the water below a sequence of multi-story open pavilions positioned along the east–west axis. The elaborate ornamentation of the columns, brackets and beams are a prime example of how stepwells were used as a form of art. A much later constructed small shrine of Hindu Goddess Bhavani is located in the lower gallery from which the stepwell derived its name. It was built before the establishment of the modern city of Ahmedabad.

The stepwell is 46 metres long and 5.1 metres wide at its entrance. It has three stories and three pavilions. The diameter of the well is 4.8 metres.

== See also ==
- Dada Harir Stepwell
- Amritavarshini Vav
- Adalaj Stepwell
- Jethabhai's Stepwell
- Ahmedabad
