= Angula =

Angula may refer to:

- Aṅgula, a measure equal to a finger's breadth
- Eel, a biological order of fish
- Nahas Angula, former Prime Minister of Namibia
- Helmut Angula

== See also ==
- Angul (disambiguation)
