= Jethabhai's Stepwell =

Stepwell in Ahmedabad, India

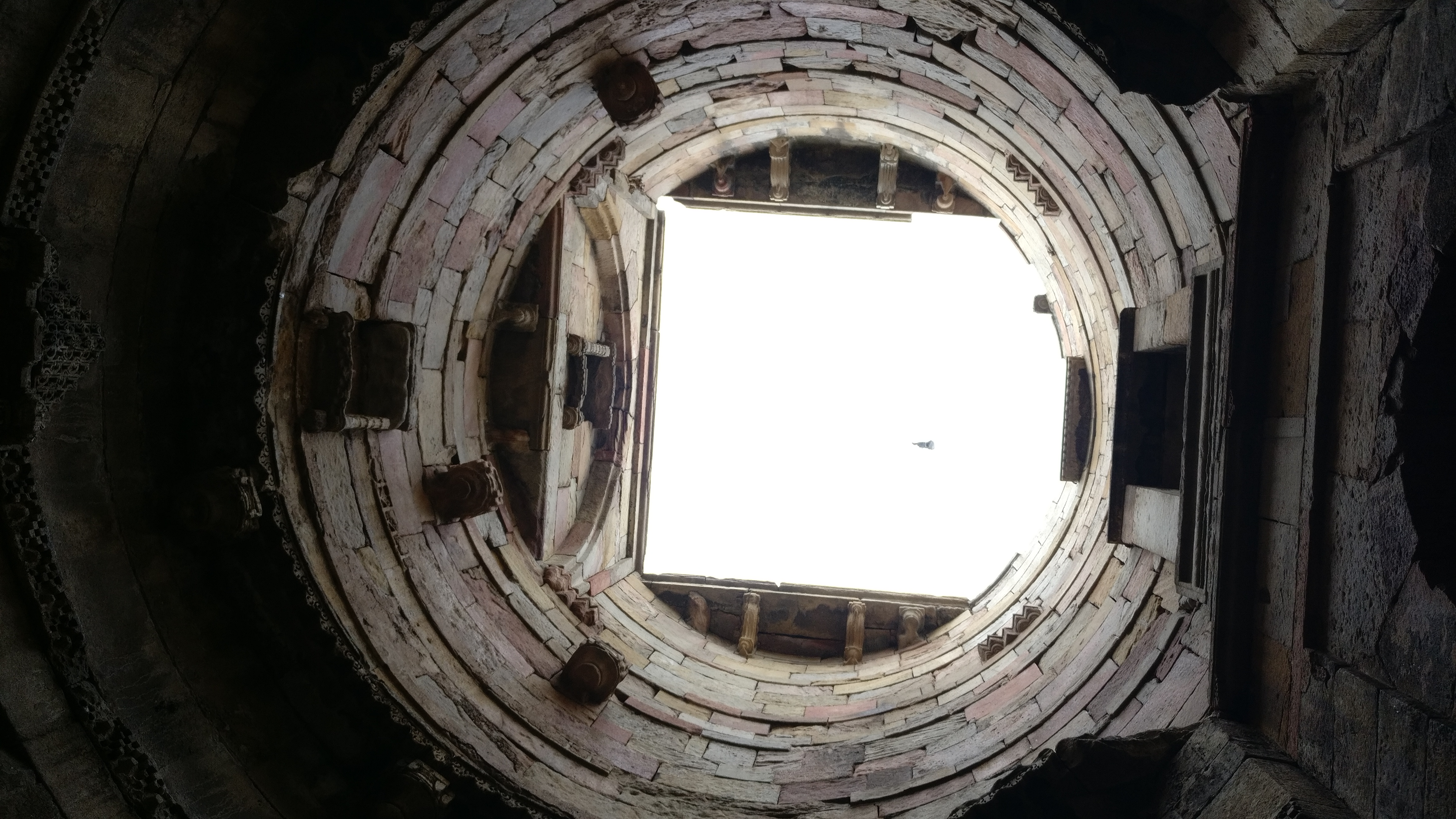

- Location in Ahmedabad, Gujarat, India Jethabhai's Stepwell (Gujarat)

Religion
- Status: Active

Location
- Location: Isanpur, Ahmedabad
- Municipality: Ahmedabad Municipal Corporation
- State: Gujarat
- Coordinates: 22.9745°N 72.6034°E

Architecture
- Type: Stepwell
- Founder: Jethabhai Mulji
- Completed: 1860s

Specifications
- Length: 210 feet (64 m)
- Width: 21–22 feet (6.4–6.7 m)

Jethabhai's Stepwell or Jethabhai ni Vav, is a stepwell in Isanpur area of Ahmedabad, Gujarat, India. It was situated near sha e Alam and one of the heritage stepwells in Ahmedabad.

== History and architecture ==
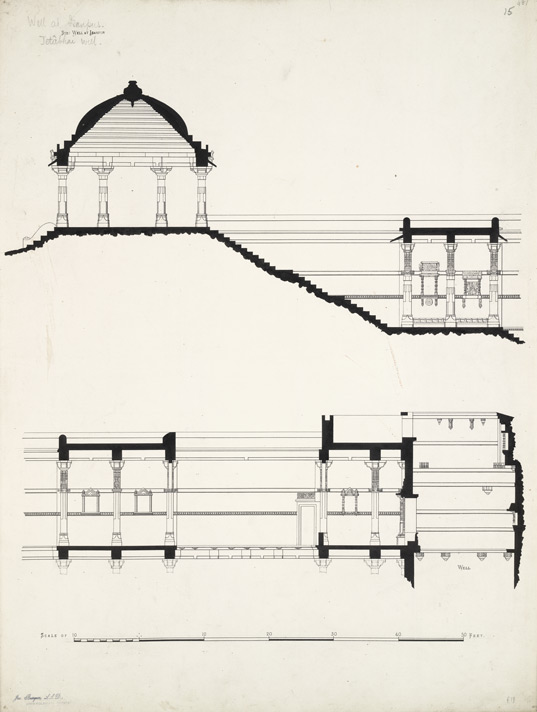
Jethabhai step well plan, 1884 sketch

James Burgess wrote in 1905 in the Archaeological Survey of Western India, volume VIII, "two and a half miles south of Ahmadabad, near Isanpur... [is] perhaps one of the most modern examples of the regular wav [step well]. It was constructed little more than forty years ago by the late Jethabhai Jivanlal Nagjibhai (or Mulji) of Ahmadabad. To obtain the materials, he purchased from the holder of Shah Alam the rauza belonging to a mosque known as that of Malik Alam...and from the late Qazi Hasan-ud-din of Ahmadabad he bought the Nenpurvada mosque at Rajapur-Hirpur together with its accompanying rauza. These were pulled down by the Hindu purchaser and the materials used in the construction of this well and in putting up a portico to his temple in the Shaherkotda suburb. In the ornamentation of the well one of the mihrabs of the mosque has evidently been utilized. This wav... is 210 feet (64 m) in length and from 21 to 22 feet (6.4 to 6.7 m) wide, with a dome raised on twelve pillars on the entrance at the west end. It has the usual descents from platform or gallery to gallery."

The stepwell was built by Jethabhai around 1860s. It has four pavilions and the entrance pavilion is canopied.

The stepwell was restored by the Archaeological Survey of India in 2017–2018.

== See also ==
- Dada Harir Stepwell
- Mata Bhavani's Stepwell
- Amritavarshini Vav
- Adalaj Stepwell
- Ahmedabad
