= Amritavarshini Vav =

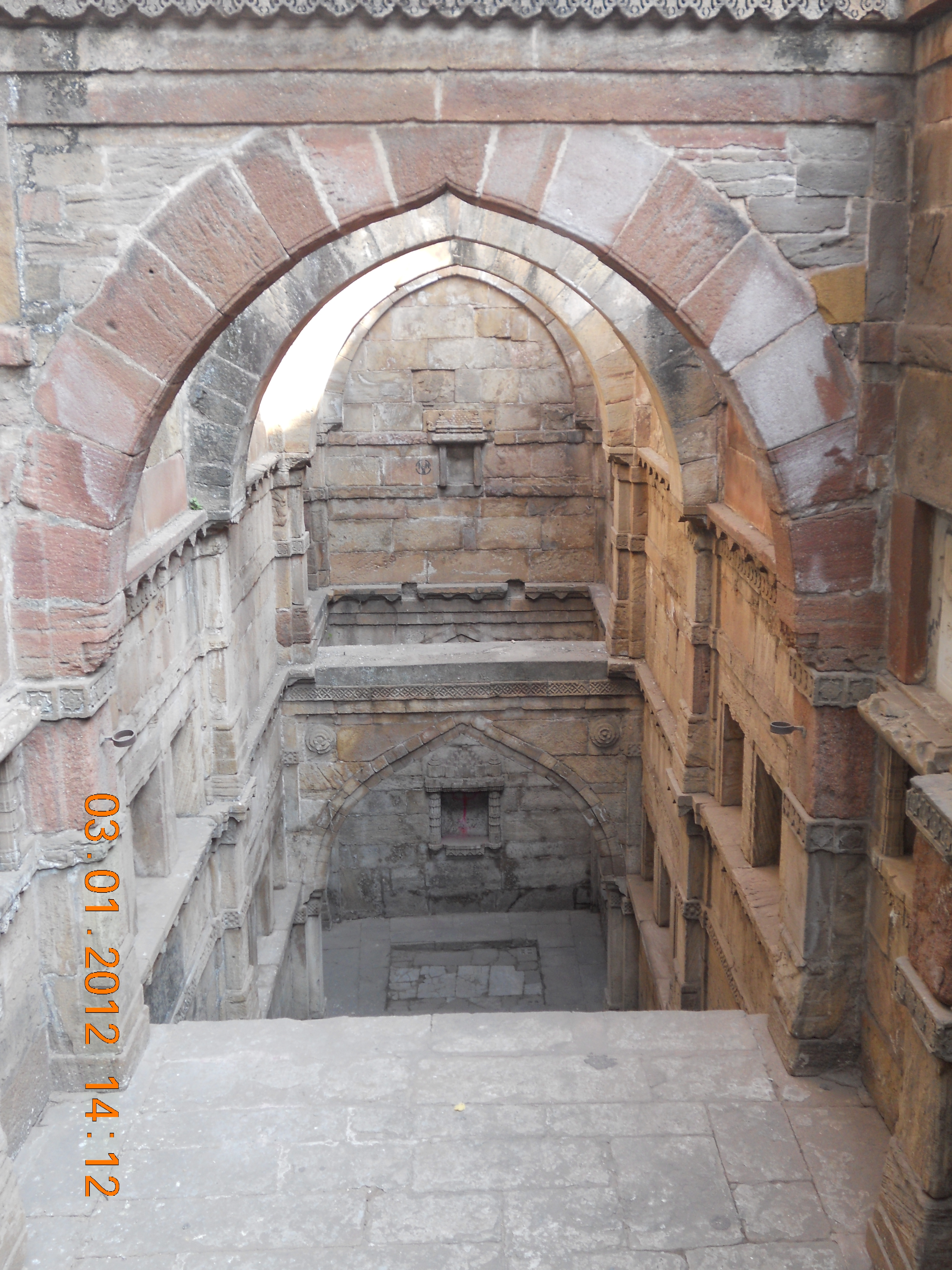
- Interactive map of the Amritavarshini Vav area

General information
- Architectural style: Hindu and Islamic architecture
- Location: Ahmedabad, India
- Coordinates: 23.02495°N 72.5972°E
- Completed: 1723

Technical details
- Floor count: Three storied stepwell

Design and construction
- Designations: S-GJ-1 (state protected monument since 1969)

Amritavarshini Vav, also known as Panchkuva Stepwell or Katkhuni Vav, is a stepwell near the Panchkuva Darwaja in Ahmedabad, Gujarat, India.

== History ==
Panchkuva, literally five wells, area derived its name the five wells in the area. Amritavarshini vav was completed in 1723 as per Devanagari and Persian inscription ( Vikram Samvat 1779 / A.H. 1135) in the stepwell. It was built by Raja Raghunathdas during his stay in the city from 1721-1722. Raghunathdas was the diwan of Haidar Quli Khan, subahdar (governor) of Gujarat.

== Architecture ==
Sparsely ornamented, Amriavarshini Vav is notable for its L-shaped plan and has simple design. It has three storeys and is more than 50 feet deep. The bracing arches have different shapes at the two storeys and in the kuta (pavilion tower) before the well shaft. It was declared a protected monument in 1969 and was conserved in 1999. It was recharged later by digging in 2004.

== Gallery ==
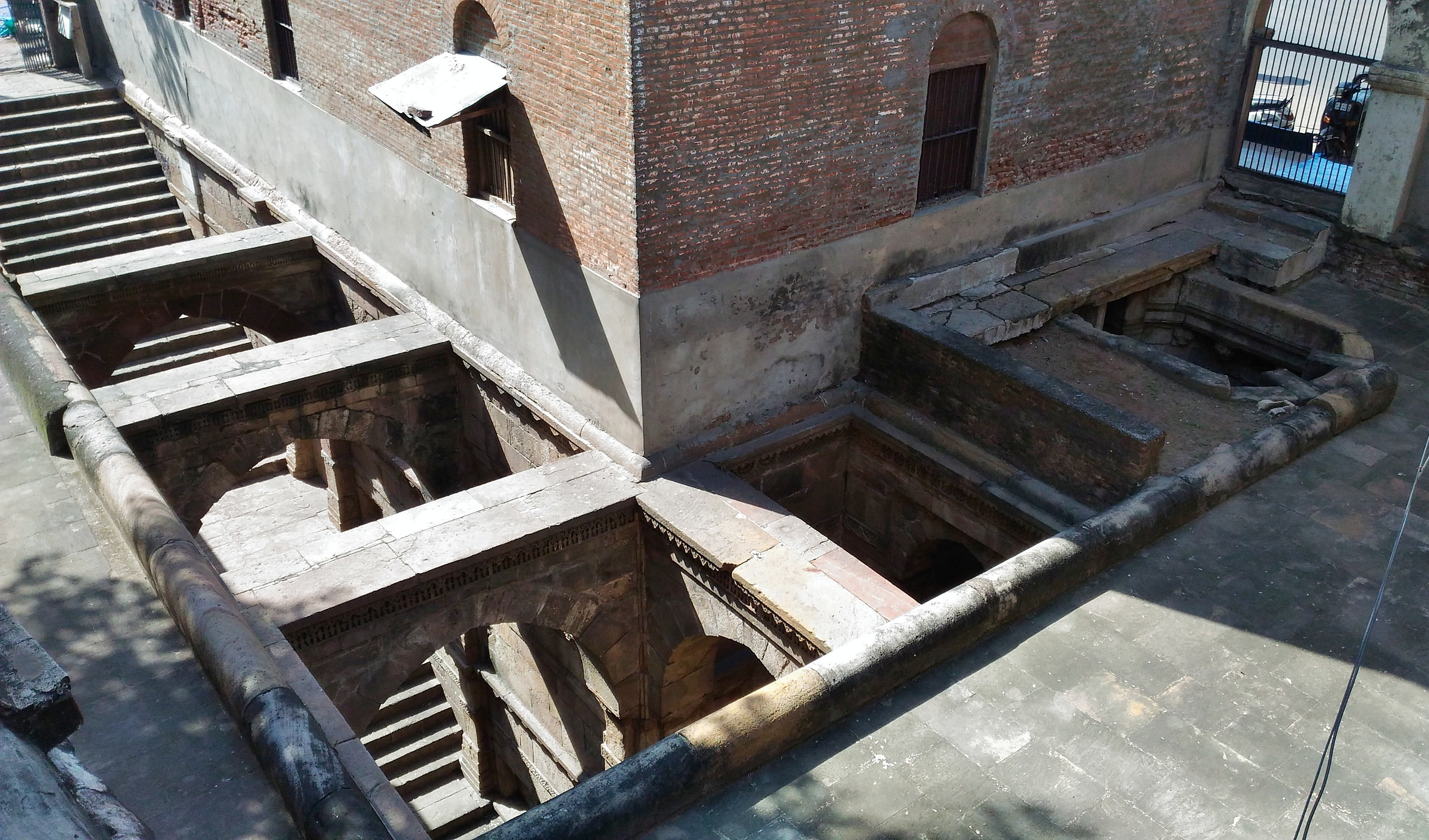
Right angled construction of stepwell

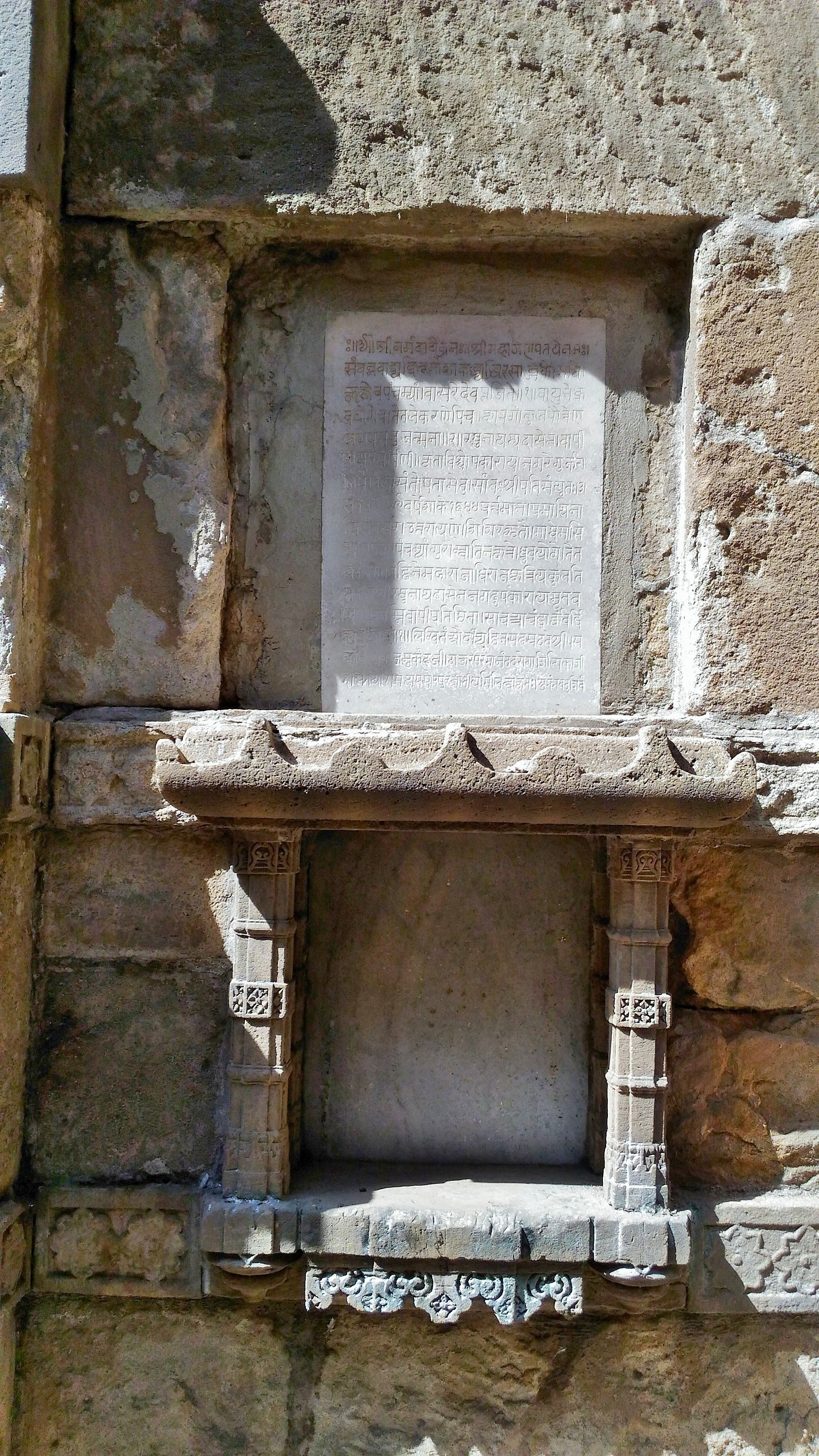
Inscriptions in the stepwell

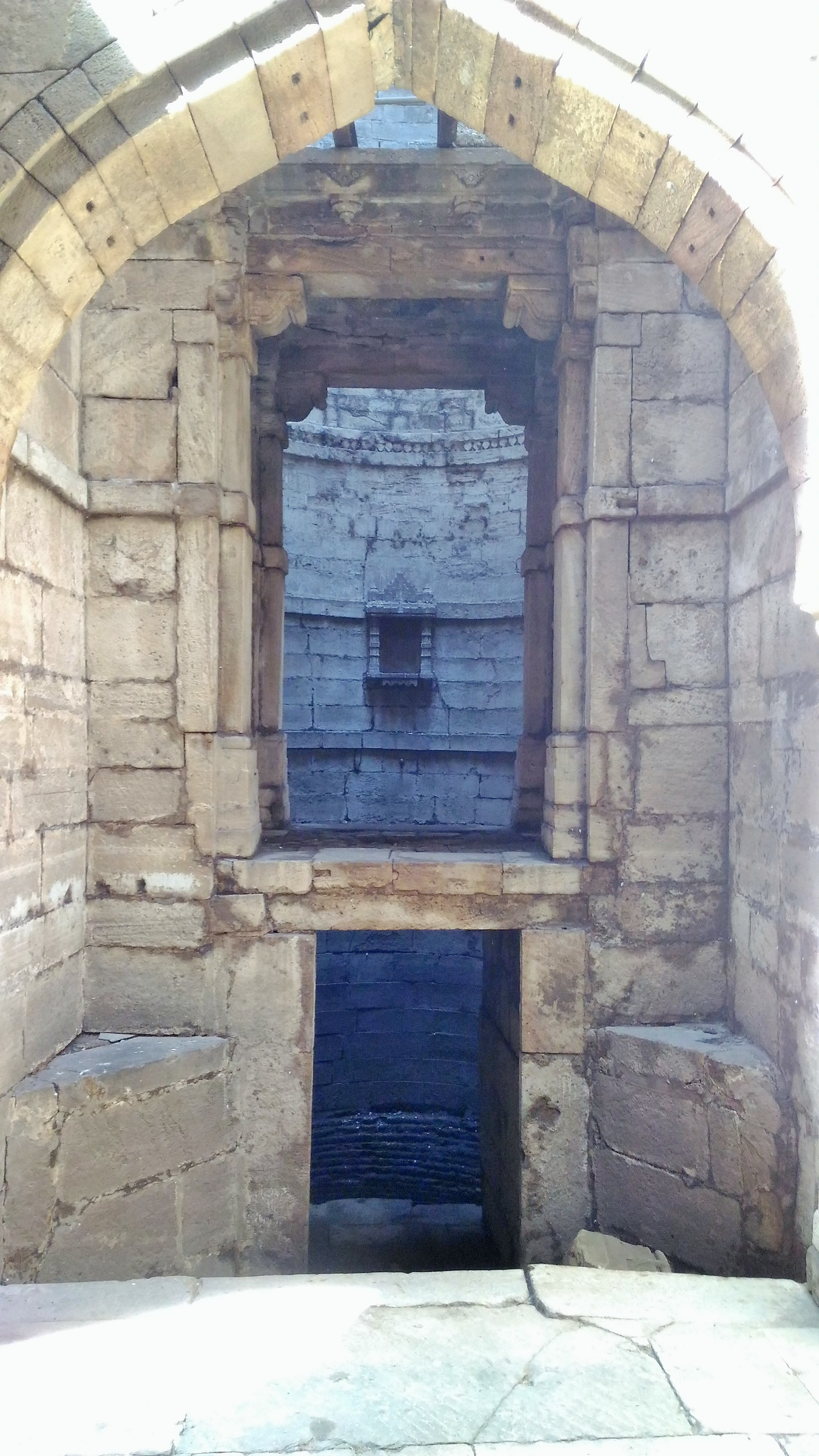
Shaft of the well

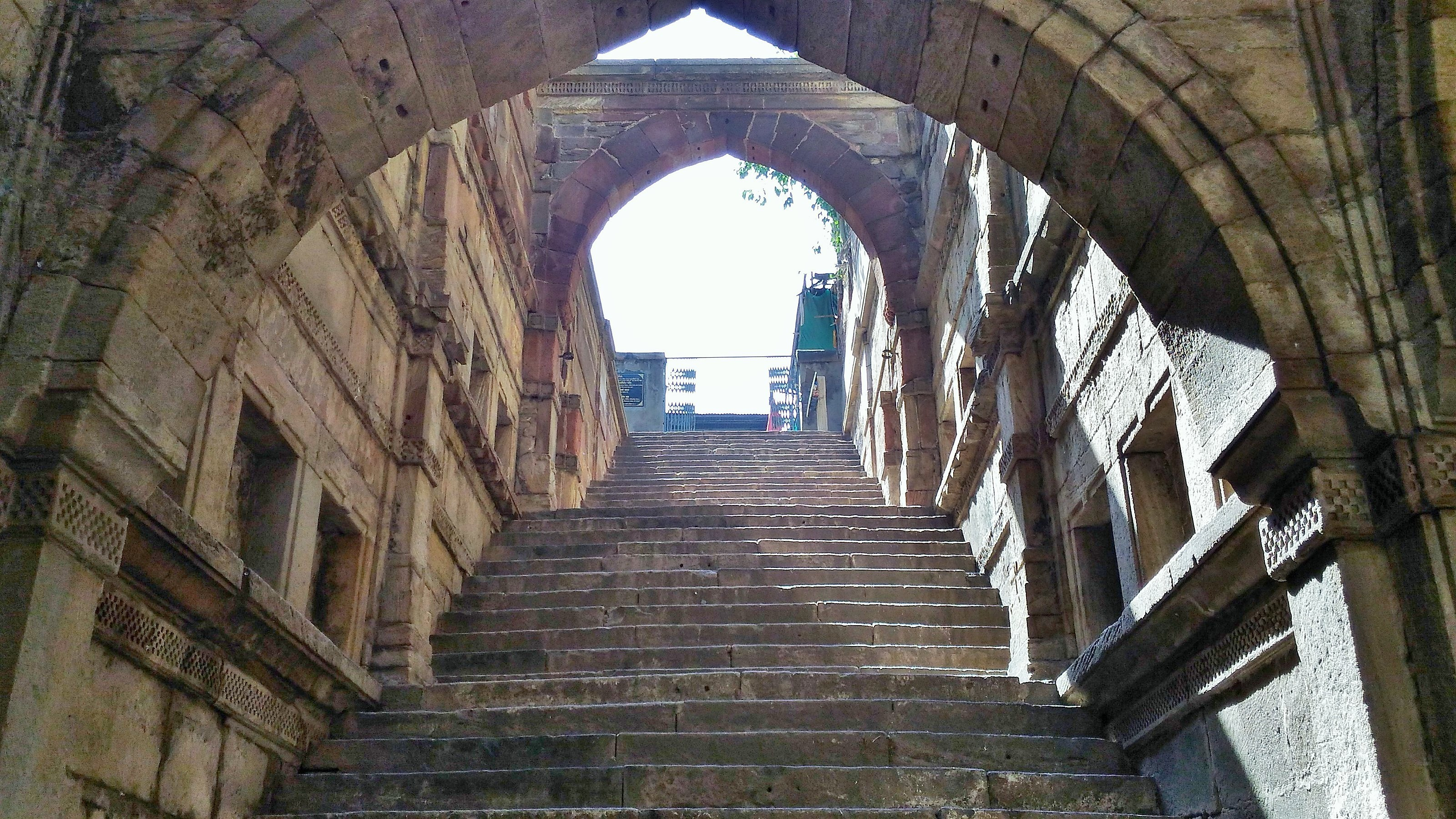
Steps from inside

== See also ==
- Adalaj Stepwell
- Dada Harir Stepwell
- Mata Bhavani's Stepwell
- Jethabhai's Stepwell
- Ahmedabad
