= Vitasti =

Ancient Indian unit of length

A vitasti (Sanskrit: वितस्ति, vitasti) is an ancient Indian unit of length approximating 21 centimeters.

== Etymology ==
The Sanskrit word vitasti, meaning "span", is an ancient Indo-Iranian term. It is derived from the Proto-Indo-Iranian term *witasti- and is related to Avestan vītasti, Kurdish bist and Persian bidast, all meaning "span".

== Measurement ==
According to the Vāstuśāstra, a vitasti is equal to 12 aṅgulas. It is defined as the long span between the extended thumb and the little finger or as the distance between the wrist and the fingertips.

== Equivalence to other units of length ==
8 Paramāṇu = 1 Rathadhūli (chariot-dust)
8 Rathadhūli = 1 Vālāgra (hair-end)
8 Vālāgra = 1 Likṣā (nit)
8 Likṣā = 1 Yūkā (louse)
8 Yūkā = 1 Yava (barley)
8 Yava = 1 Aṅgula (finger)
12 Aṅgula = 1 Vitasti (span)
2 Vitasti = 1 Kiṣku (cubit)
