= Isanpur =

- Neighbourhood
- Location in Ahmedabad, Gujarat, India Isanpur (Gujarat)
- Coordinates: 22.9807°N 72.6012°E
- Country: India
- State: Gujarat
- District: Ahmedabad

Government
  - Body: Ahmedabad Municipal Corporation

Languages
  - Official: Gujarati, Hindi
- Time zone: UTC+5:30 (IST)
- PIN: 382443
- Telephone code: 91-079
- Vehicle registration: GJ
- Lok Sabha constituency: Ahmedabad
- Vidhan Sabha constituency: Maninagar
- Civic agency: Ahmedabad Municipal Corporation
- Website: gujaratindia.com

Isanpur is an area located in Ahmedabad, India. Earlier It was a small village near the Ahmedabad city which is now part of the city. It has been named after Isan Malik who was a ruler of area and subordinate of emperor Kutubuddin Aibak also known as a builder of Kutub Minar.

== See also ==
- Jethabhai Stepwell
