= Hasta (unit) =

Arm-based measure

The hasta (Sanskrit: हस्त (hásta); Chinese: 肘 (pinyin: zhǒu)) is a traditional Indian unit of length, measured from the elbow to the tip of the middle finger. It equals 24 aṅgulas orﾠ about 18 inches, about 45 centimetres.

4 hastas make one dhanus, and 400 hastas make one nalva. 8 hastas make one rajju.

== See also ==
- Cubit
