= Aṅgula =

Indian unit of measurement

Aṅgula (from Sanskrit: अङ्गुल aṅgula - 'a finger; the thumb; a finger's breadth') is a measure of length. Twelve aṅgulas make a Vitasti or span, and twenty-four a Hasta or Cubit. 108 Angulam make a 'Dhanusha'.

One Aṅgula during the Maurya period is believed to be approximately equal to 1.763 centimetres.

Dimensional analysis of the oldest engineered caves at the Barabar and Nagarjuni hills (dated to the Mauryan Period) has revealed that the basic length measure (angulam) of this period was 1.763 cm. The planning of these cave complexes was executed using the traditional measurement units mentioned in the Arthashastra, in particular the Danda measuring 96 Angulams. As the basic length measure is also noted in several Harappan civilization sites, this sudy confirms that Harappan metrological ideas were transmitted virtually unchanged from the Harappan civilization to the Ganga civilization, thereby proving the continuity of the people themselves who built their settlements upon this tradition.

— R. Balasubramanian New Insights on metrology during Maurya period

In the Hindu Āgamas, the size of an aṅgula is considerably larger – "the length of the middle digit [phalange] of the middle finger", but the ratios with the larger units remain unchanged.
