= Kashti =

Kashti may refer to:

== Places ==
- Kashti, Nashik, a village in Nashik District, Maharashtra, India
- Kasti, Maharashtra (Kashti), a village in Ahmadnagar District, Maharashtra, India
- Kasti, Rajasthan (Kashti), a village in Jodhpur District, Rajasthan, India
- Keshtu (Kashti), a village in Shonbeh and Tasuj District, Dashti County, Bushehr Province, Iran

== Media ==
- Kashti (TV series), Indian television series
- Kashti (1954 film), List of Bollywood films of 1954

== See also ==
- Kasti (disambiguation)
