= Casta (disambiguation) =

Casta may refer to:

== Persons, peoples ==
- Casta (Spanish: caste, lineage), a term used in 17th- and 18th-century Spanish America
- Laetitia Casta, French model and actress
- Léa Casta, French snowboarder

== Other uses ==
- Častá, a Slovak village
- Casta 2E1 a Russian surveillance radar

== See also ==
- Casti (disambiguation)
- Casto (disambiguation)
- Caste (disambiguation)
- Cast (disambiguation)
- Kasta, a Russian rap group
