= Kasti, Rajasthan =

Village in Rajasthan, India

Kasti Kaasti
- village
- Location in Rajasthan, India Kasti (India)
- Coordinates: 26°34′21″N 073°13′38″E
- Country: India
- State: Rajasthan
- District: Jodhpur
- Tehsil: Bawadi

Government
  - Body: Village panchayat
- Time zone: UTC+5:30 (IST)
- PIN: 342037
- ISO 3166 code: RJ-IN
- Vehicle registration: RJ-

Kasti also known as Kaasti is a panchayat village in the state of Rajasthan, India. Administratively, Kasti is under Bawadi tehsil of Jodhpur District in Rajasthan. Kasti is 8 km by gravel road east of the village of Netran (Netra) and National Highway 65. It is 8 km by hard-surfaced road southeast of the town of Baori.

There are two villages in the Kasti gram panchayat" Kasti and Lunawas.

== Demographics ==
In the 2001 census, the village of Kasti had 2,017 inhabitants, with 1,011 males (50.1%) and 1,006 females (49.9%), for a gender ratio of 995 females per thousand males.
