= Kasti =

Kasti may refer to several places:

Estonia

- Kasti, Rapla County, a village in Rapla County, western Estonia
- Kasti, Saare County, a village in Saare County, western Estonia

India

- Kasti, Maharashtra, a village in Ahmadnagar District, Maharashtra
- Kasti, Rajasthan, a village in Jodhpur District, Rajasthan

== See also ==
- Casti (disambiguation)
- Gasti, village in Iran
