= Baori (disambiguation) =

Baori may refer to:

- a stepwell (in India and Pakistan), as baori is one of the Hindi and Urdu terms for a stepwell

== Places ==
A number of places in Pakistan and India have been named baori after their step-wells:

- Baori, Bawadi, a panchayat town and taluka headquarters in Jodhpur District, Rajasthan, India

== See also ==
- Baoris and Baorini, a genus and tribe of skipper butterflies
