= Netra, Jodhpur =

Netra Netran
- village
- Location in Rajasthan, India Netra (India)
- Coordinates: 26°34′30″N 073°09′09″E
- Country: India
- State: Rajasthan
- District: Jodhpur
- Tehsil: Bawadi

Government
  - Body: Village panchayat
- Time zone: UTC+5:30 (IST)
- ISO 3166 code: RJ-IN
- Vehicle registration: RJ-

Netra is a panchayat village in the state of Rajasthan, India. Administratively, Netra is under Bawadi tehsil of Jodhpur District in Rajasthan. Netra is the only village in its gram panchayat. The village is located on National Highway 65, 8 km by road southwest of the town of Baori, and 37 km by road north-northeast of the city of Jodhpur.

== Demographics ==
In the 2001 census, the village of Netra had 3,757 inhabitants, with 1,989 males (52.9%) and 1,768 females (47.1%), for a gender ratio of 889 females per thousand males.
