= Chand Baori =

Stepwell in Abhaneri, Rajasthan, India

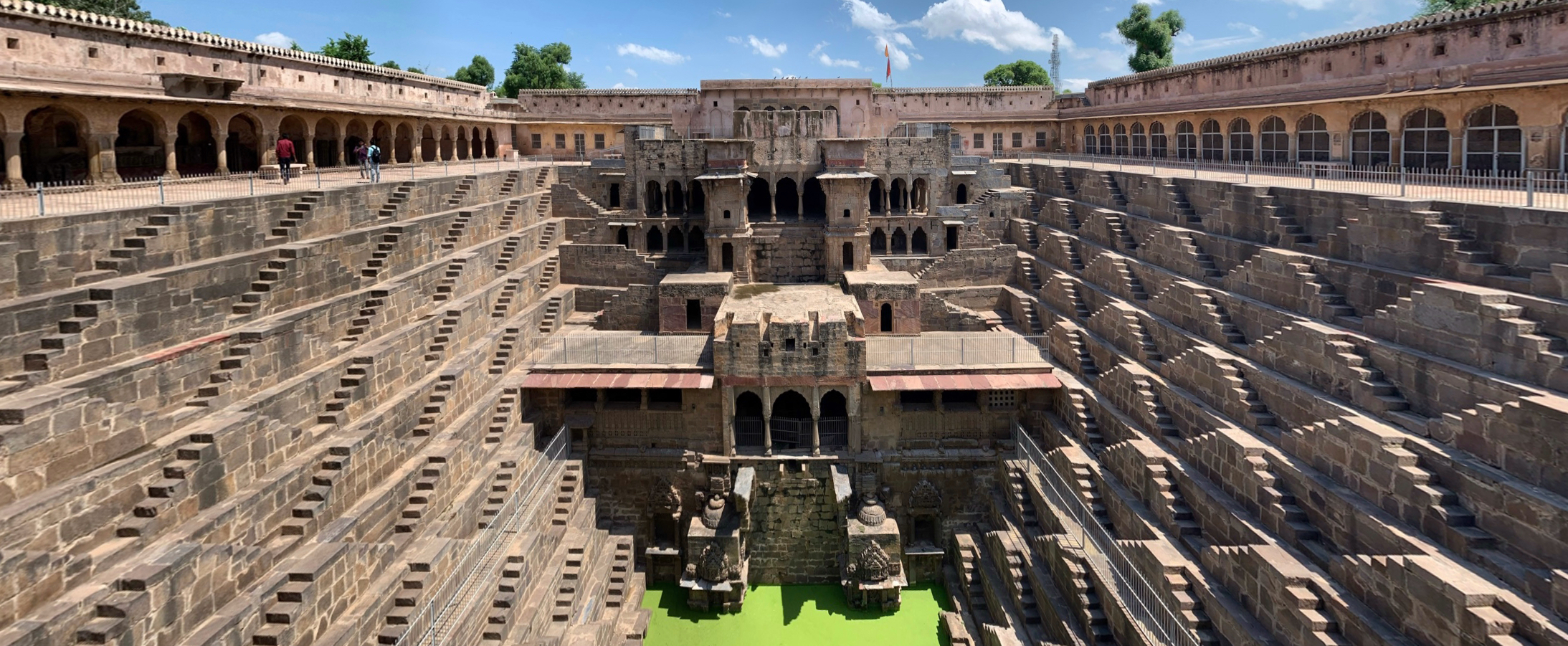
- Chand Baori

- Location within Rajasthan Location within India

General information
- Architectural style: Mihira Bhoja
- Location: Bandikui, Dausa, Rajasthan, India
- Coordinates: 27°00′26″N 76°36′23″E
- Construction started: c. 800
- Completed: c. 900; 1126 years ago

Chand Baori is a stepwell situated in the village of Abhaneri in the Indian state of Rajasthan. It extends approximately 30 m (100 ft) into the ground, making it one of the deepest and largest stepwells in India. It is named after a local ruler of the Nikumbh dynasty called Raja Chanda, and its construction is dated to the 8th–9th centuries. It has 3500 steps cascading 13 stories deep into a massive tank at the bottom and has been constructed in an upside-down pyramid style.

== History ==
Chand Baori is said to be named after a local ruler of Nikumbh dynasty called Raja Chanda. However, no epigraphic evidence has been found regarding the construction of the Chand Baori or the adjoining Harshat Mata Temple. Based on similarities in style and carvings with the terraced temples of Paranagar and Mandore, the Baori can be dated to the 8th-9th century. It was likely constructed before the temple. According to Morna Livingston in Steps to Water: The Ancient Stepwells of India, Chand Baori is one of the few stepwells that has "two classical periods of water building in a single setting".

The oldest parts of the step-well date from the 8th century onwards. An upper palace building was added to the site, which can be seen from the tabulated arches used by the Chauhan rulers. Adjoining the baori is the architecturally splendid and sculpturally beautiful Harshat Mata Temple, which was built between the 7th and 8th centuries, but was destroyed and damaged by Mahmud of Ghazni. Many of its pillars, columns, and statues now lie scattered. The Mughals also destroyed the Baori interior sculptures. Today, there are remains of old sculptures and carvings, which were suggested to be in the temple or in the various rooms. The nearby temple of Harshat Mata, goddess of joy, was a pilgrimage site and formed a complex alongside the well.

Many of these stepwells, including Chand Baori, served multiple purposes alongside drawing water and played a significant role in religious and ceremonial activities. Pilgrims are said to have found comfort in quenching their thirst and finding a resting spot at the steps of Chand Baori after their long travels. This unique form of underground well-architecture remains constant from the 7th century in the existing monument. Excavated stones of the temple are now kept by the Archaeological Survey of India in the arcades of the well. Chand Baori is a significant architectural site in western India.

== Overview ==
Chand Baori is a deep four-sided well with a large temple located in the back of the well. The basic architectural aspects of the monumental well consists of a long corridor of steps leading to five or six stories below ground level, which can be seen at the site. Chand Baori consists of 3,500 narrow steps over 13 stories. The state of Rajasthan is extremely arid, and the design and final structure of Chand Baori were intended to conserve as much water as possible.

Ancient Indian scriptures made references to the construction of wells, canals, tanks, and dams and their efficient operation and maintenance. This site combined many of these operations to allow for easy access to local water. At the bottom of the well, the air remains 5-6 °C cooler than at the surface, and Chand Baori was used as a community gathering place for locals during periods of intense heat. One side of the well has a haveli pavilion and resting room for the royals.

== Architecture ==
Chand Baori is considered to be one of the oldest surviving step wells in the country. On three sides, It has 3,500 steps cascading 13 storeys deep into a massive tank at the bottom. The fourth side has pillared corridors at many levels. Of interest here is its exquisite diamond-setting geometry of the cascading steps on three sides and the image of Sheshasayee Vishnu reclining on the serpent Ananta. This baori or stepwell has been constructed in an upside-down pyramid-style. The classical Indian texts on architecture (Vastu) like Aparajitapriccha or Vishvakarma's Vastushastra call this design a vijay vapi. The baori has double flights of steps on each of its ten landings on all three sides. On the fourth side, to the north, is a pillared corridor of many stories. This wall at the north contains two projected offsets to house a niche in each of them. These two niches serve as shrines, the right one houses the deity Ganesha while the left one has an image of Mahishasuramardini. The Ganesha shrine is crowned with chaitya having a female dancer and her attendant carved over it. There are many other dancing figures and attendants carved around this structure. On the upper section, carvings depicting Uma-Maheshwara and Simhavahini Durga can be seen in small modifications, repairs, and reconstructions since its construction as it was in continuous use till the late medieval period. The ancient stepwell underwent many changes for both beautification and better utility. A pillared verandah on all four sides seems to be a later addition. There is also a small room, Anderi Ujala, which was a spot to draw water with some traditional pulley-like equipment. Legend also says that a tunnel connected Abhaneri to Dausa.

== In media ==
Chand Baori has been used as a filming location for a number of films, such as Bhoomi, The Fall, Bhool Bhulaiyaa, and Paheli. The 2012 Hollywood movie The Dark Knight Rises starring Christian Bale as Batman used Chand Baori as inspiration for one of its production sets but was not actually filmed on location at Chand Baori.

== Gallery ==
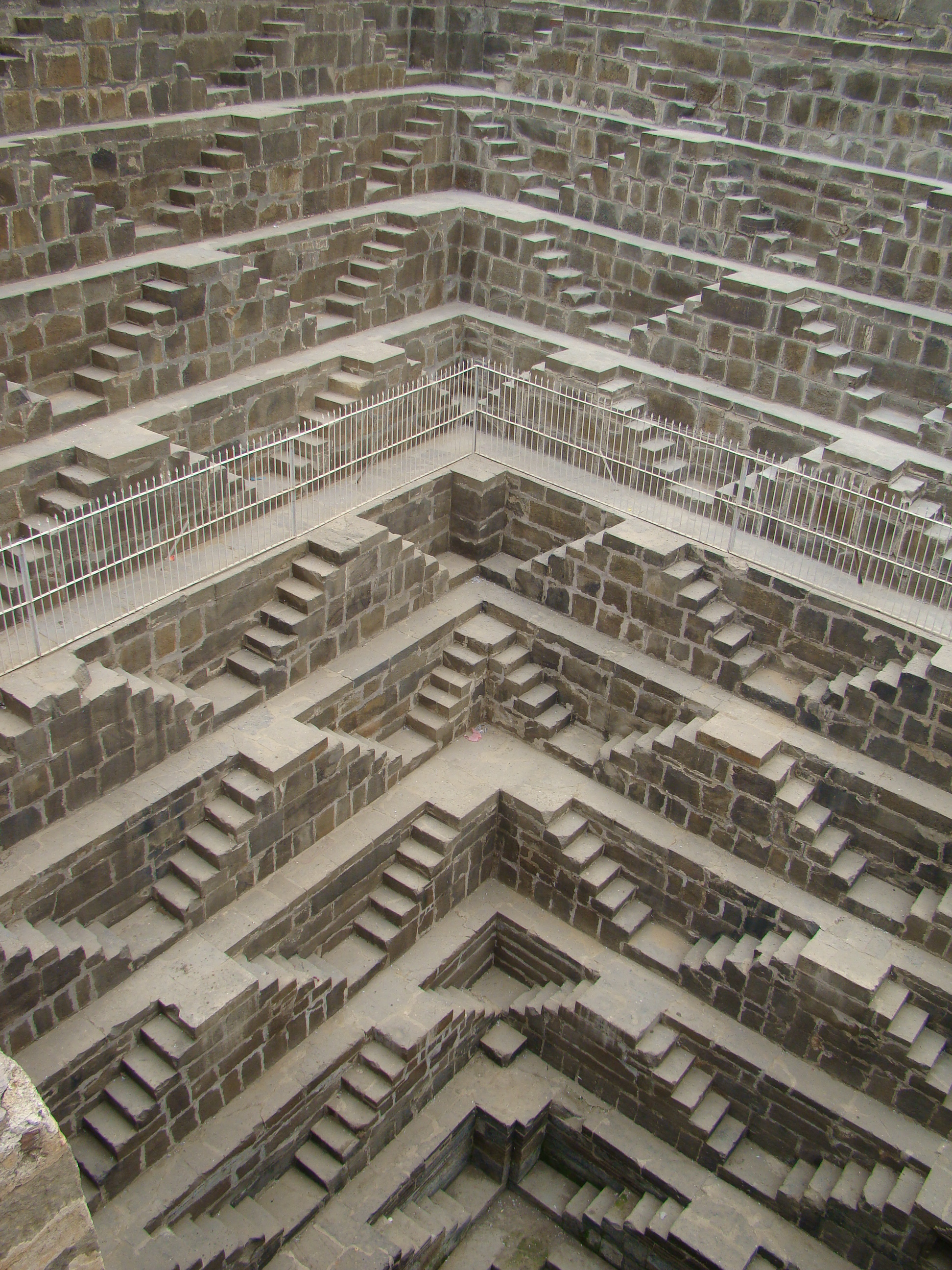
Steps of the well

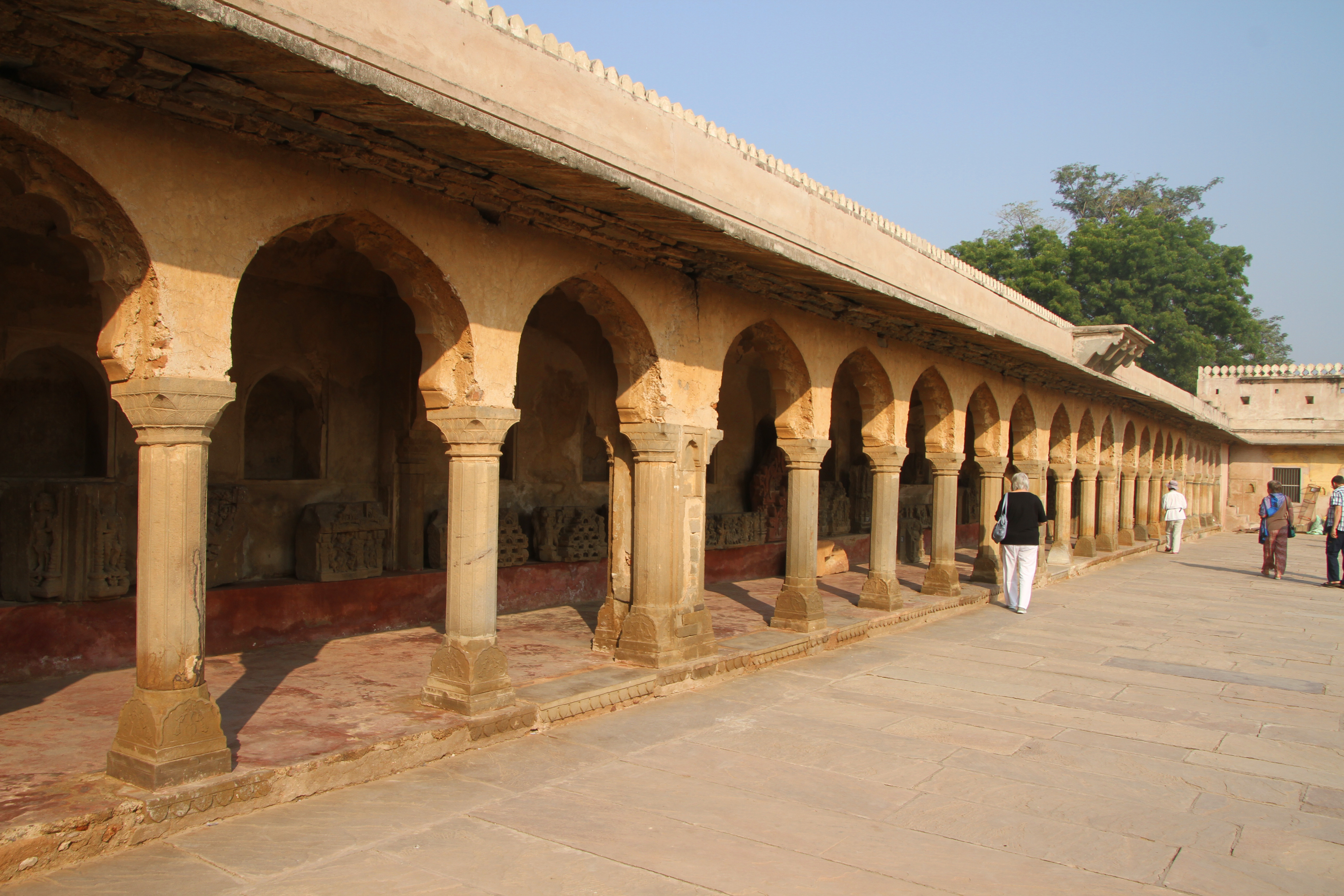
Arched arcade around the well

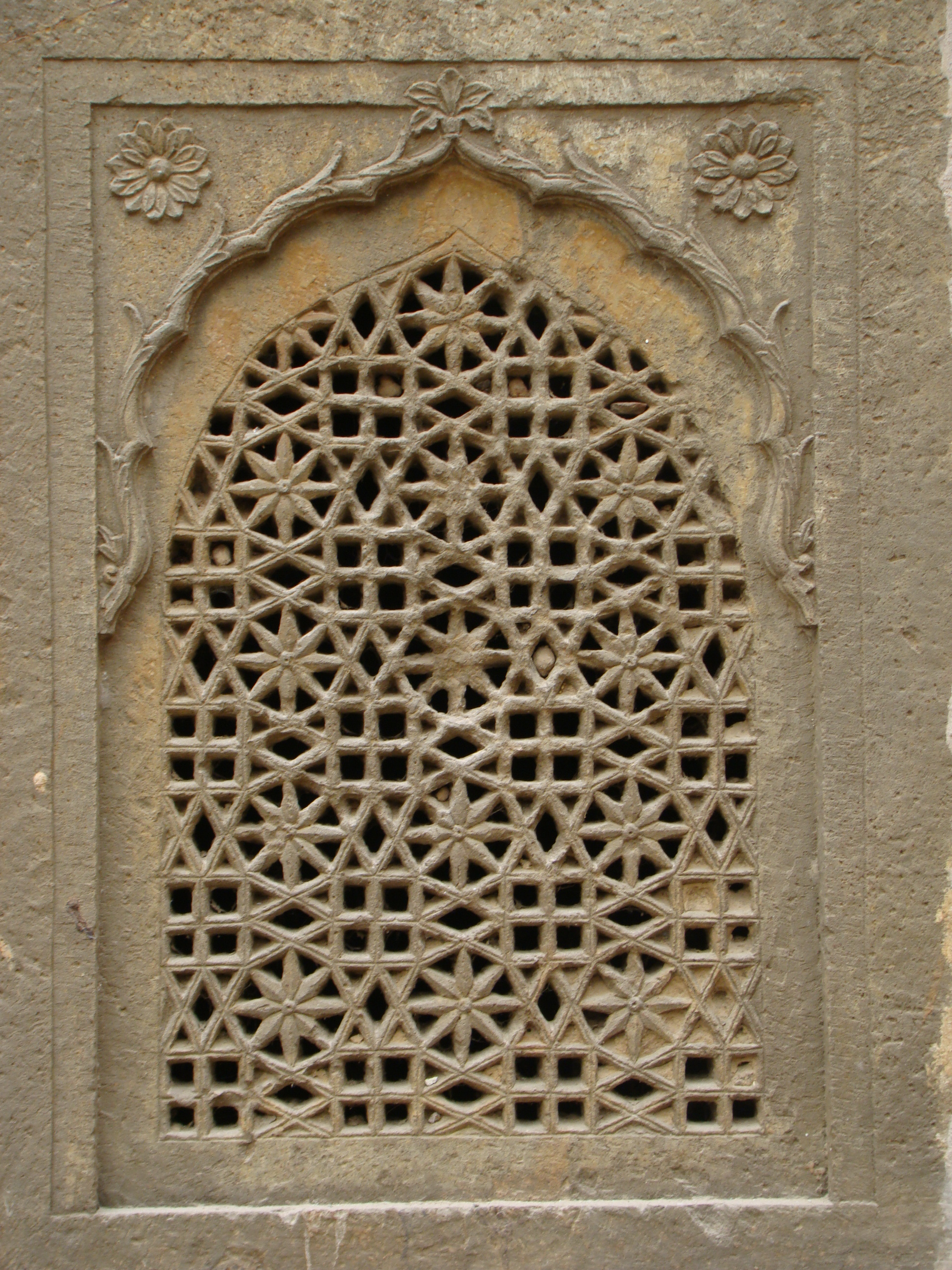
Stone carved window of the royal haveli

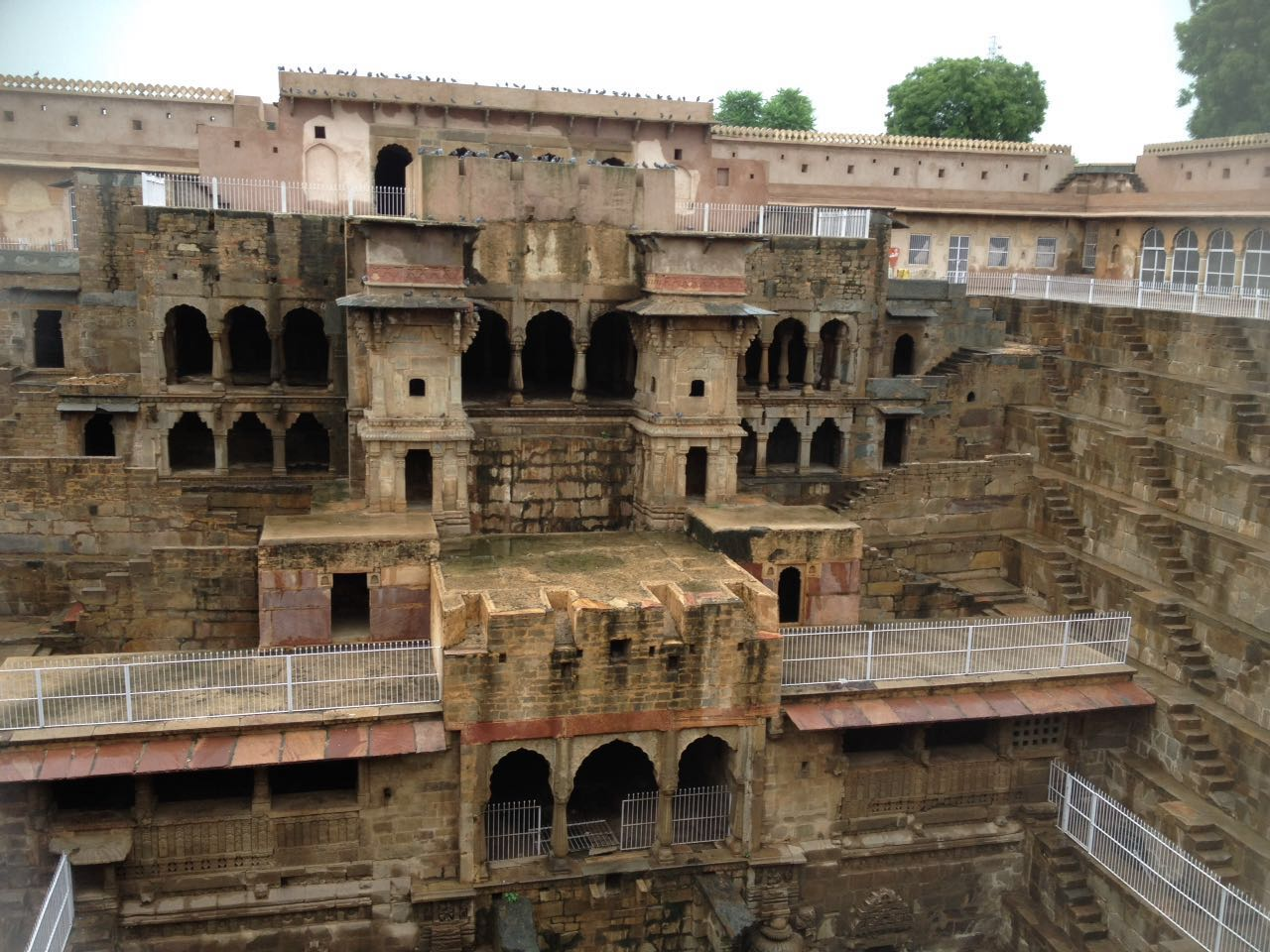
The northern side of Chand Baori

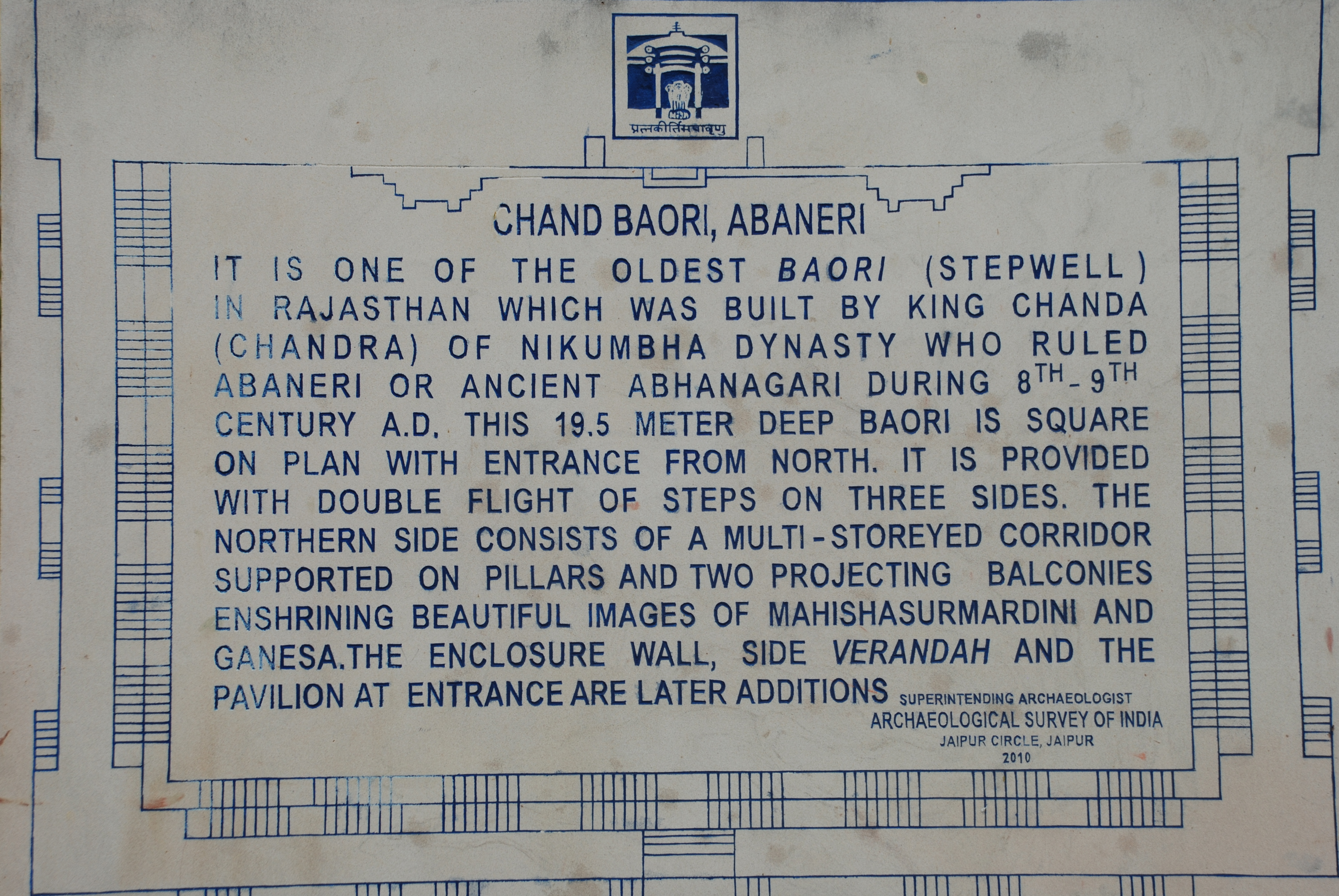
Chand Baori Plaque

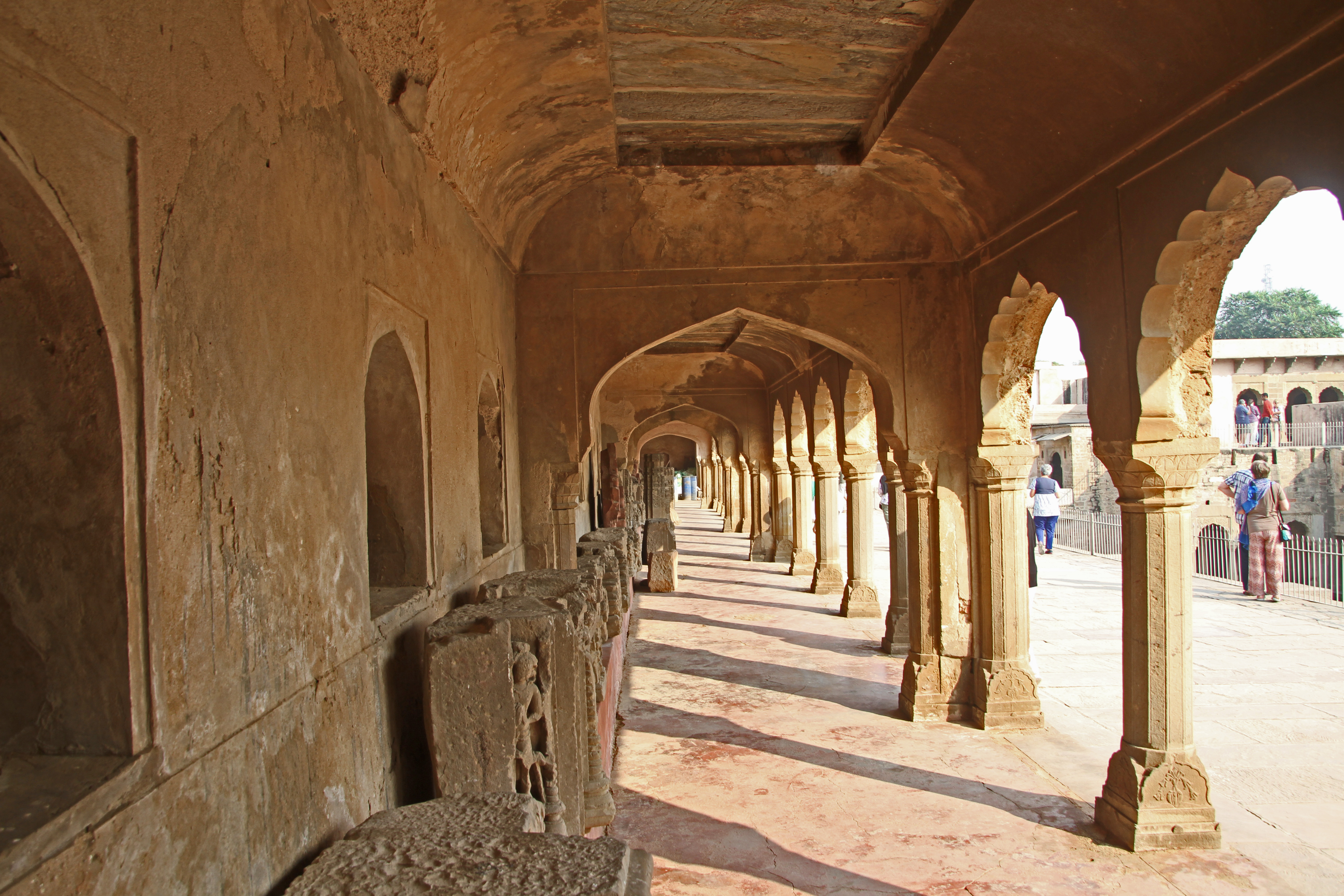
Verandah, Chand Baori

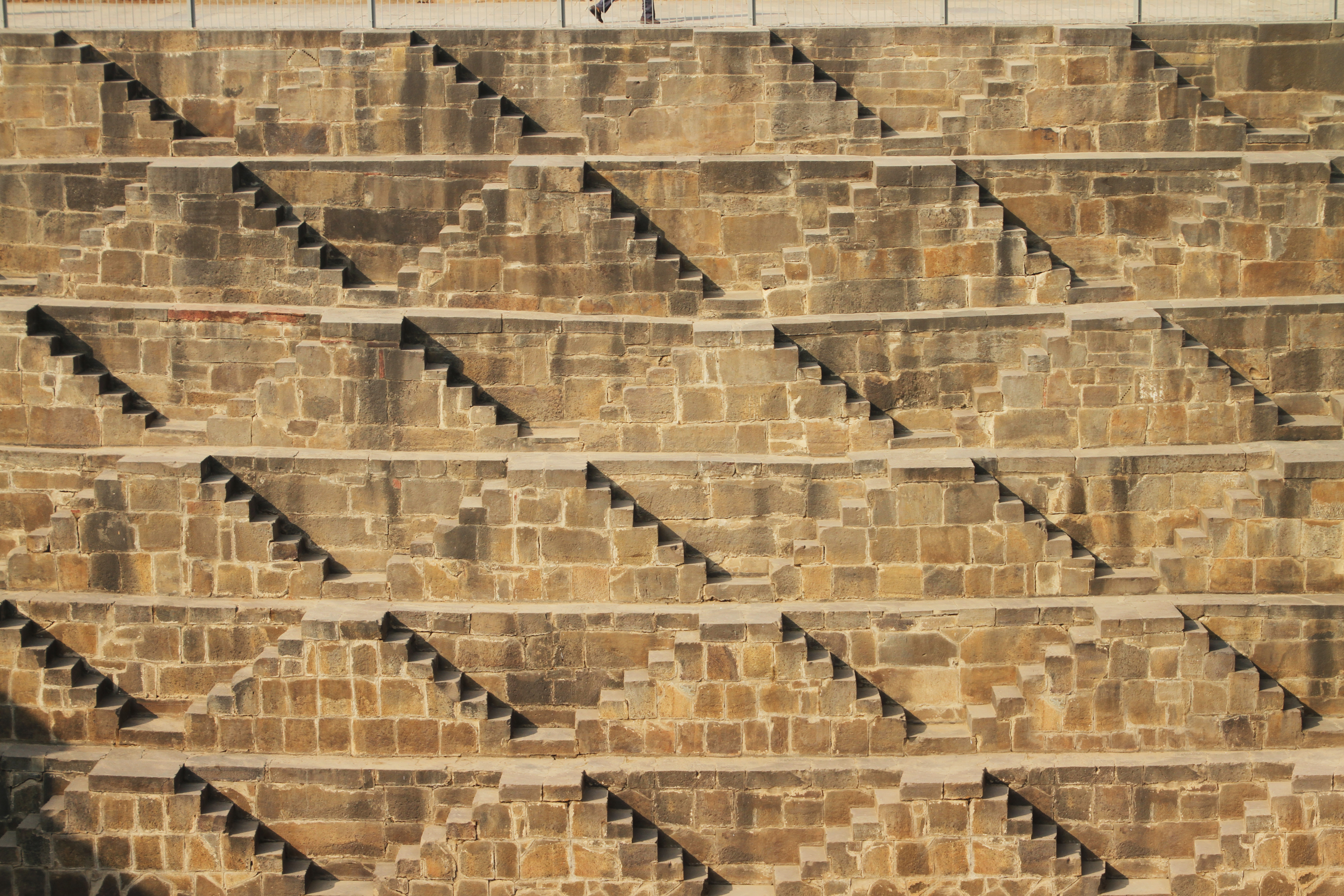
The cascading steps, Chand Baori

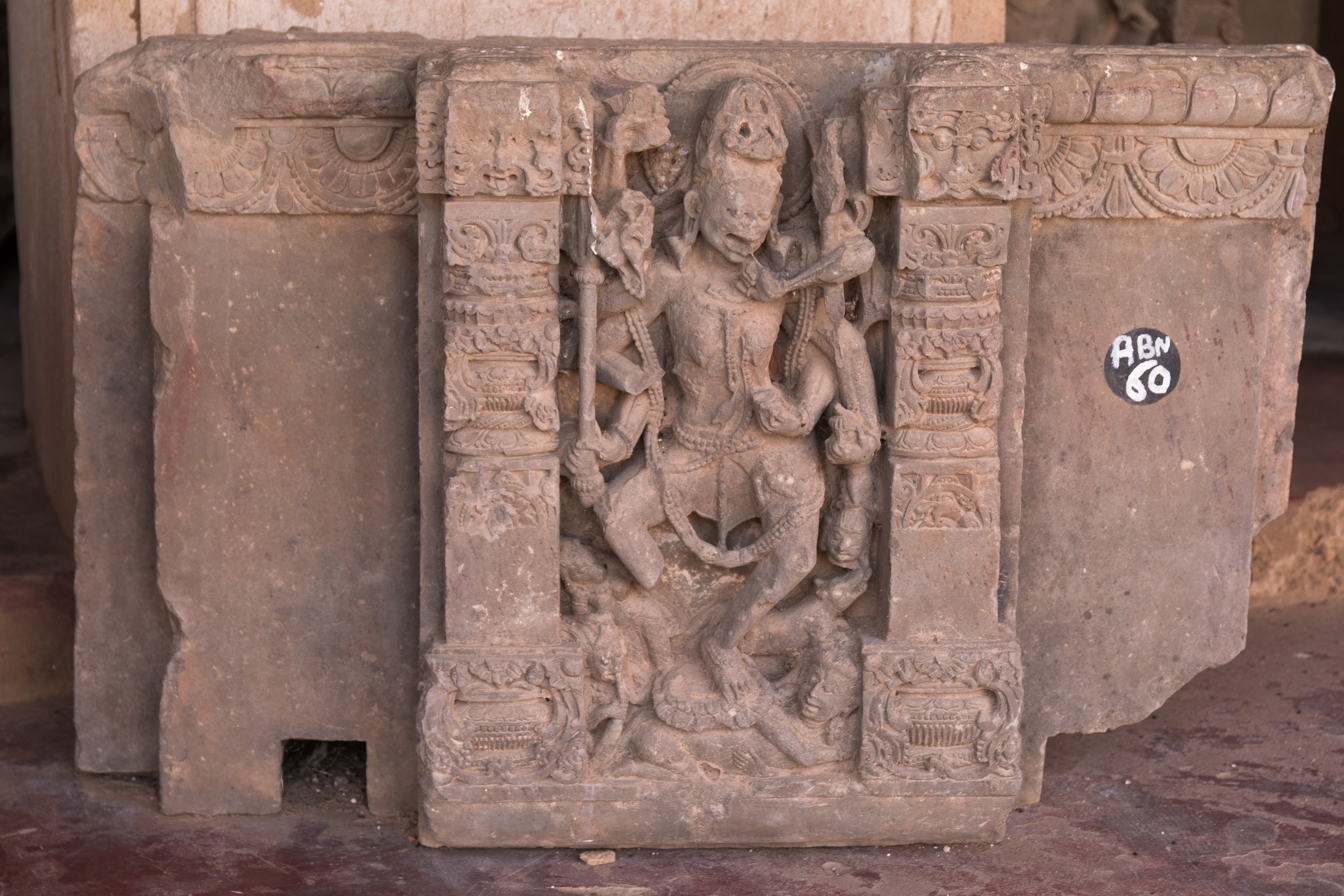
Durga image, Chand Baori, Gallery

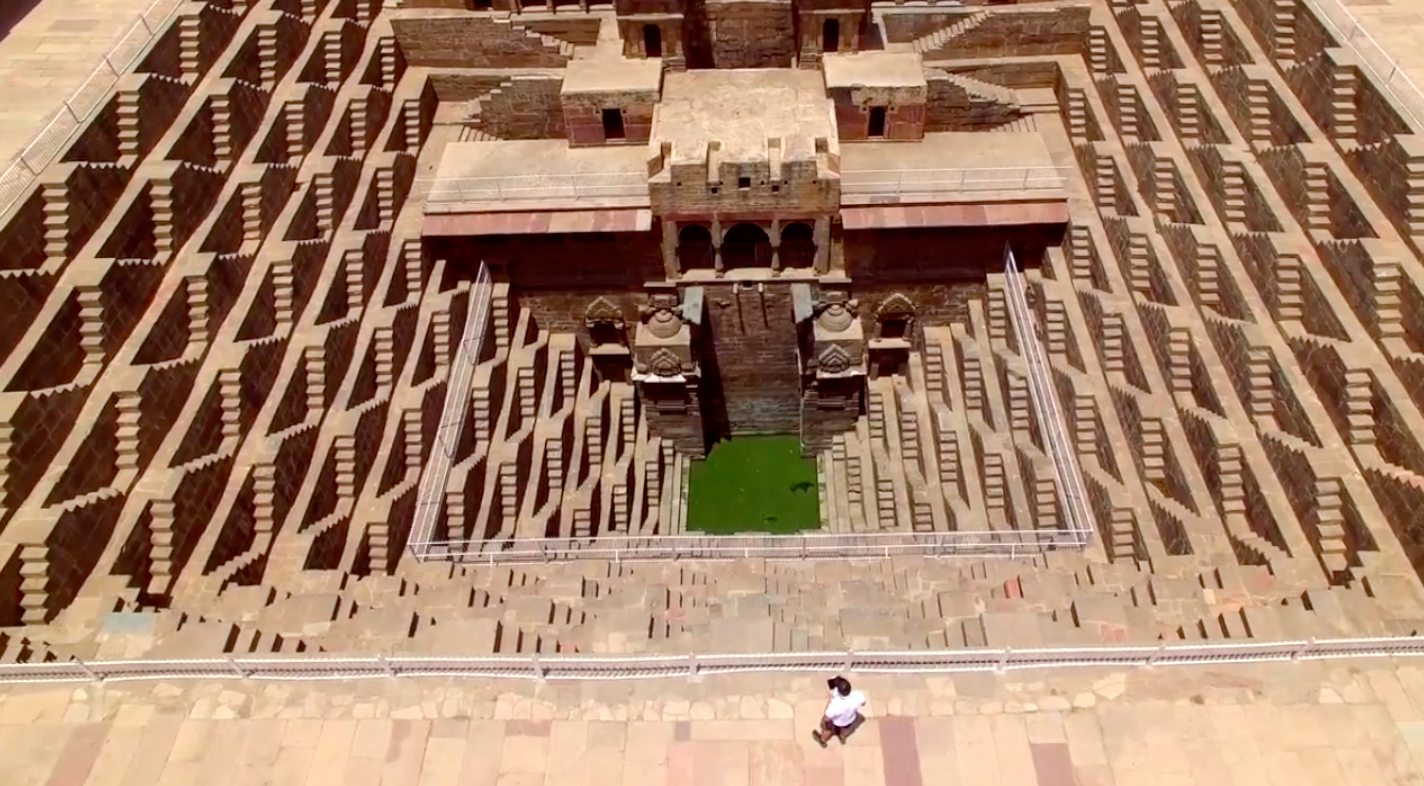
Overview of Chand Baori, Abhaneri

== See also ==
- Stepwells of India
  - Rani ki vav, UNESCO heritage listed
  - List of stepwells in India by states
- History of water supply and sanitation
  - Water supply and sanitation in the Indus-Saraswati Valley Civilisation
  - Ancient water conservation techniques
