= Casti =

Casti can refer to:

- Casti connubii, a papal encyclical
- Casti-Wergenstein, a Swiss municipality composed of Casti and Wergenstein

== People ==
- Emanuela Casti, Italian geographer
- Giovanni Battista Casti, Italian poet
- Giuseppe Casti, Italian politician
- John Casti, author, mathematician, and entrepreneur

== See also ==
- Kasti (disambiguation)
- Emmanuel Castis, South African actor, singer, and dancer
- Gasti, village in Iran
