= Casto =

Casto may refer to:

== People ==
=== Given name ===
- Casto (footballer) (born 1982), Spanish footballer
- Casto Innocenzio Ansaldi (1710–1780), Italian professor, theologian and archaeologist
- Casto Méndez Núñez (1824–1869), Spanish naval officer
- Casto Nopo, Equatoguinean football manager
- Casto Plasencia (1846–1890), Spanish painter

=== Surname ===
- Frank M. Casto (1875–1965), American orthodontist
- Immanuel Casto (born 1983), Italian songwriter
- Kory Casto (born 1981), American baseball player
- Martha Curnutt Casto (1812–1887), American murderer

== Places ==
- Casto, Lombardy, Italy
