= Harshat Mata Temple =

Hindu temple in Rajasthan, India

Harshat Mata ki Mandir
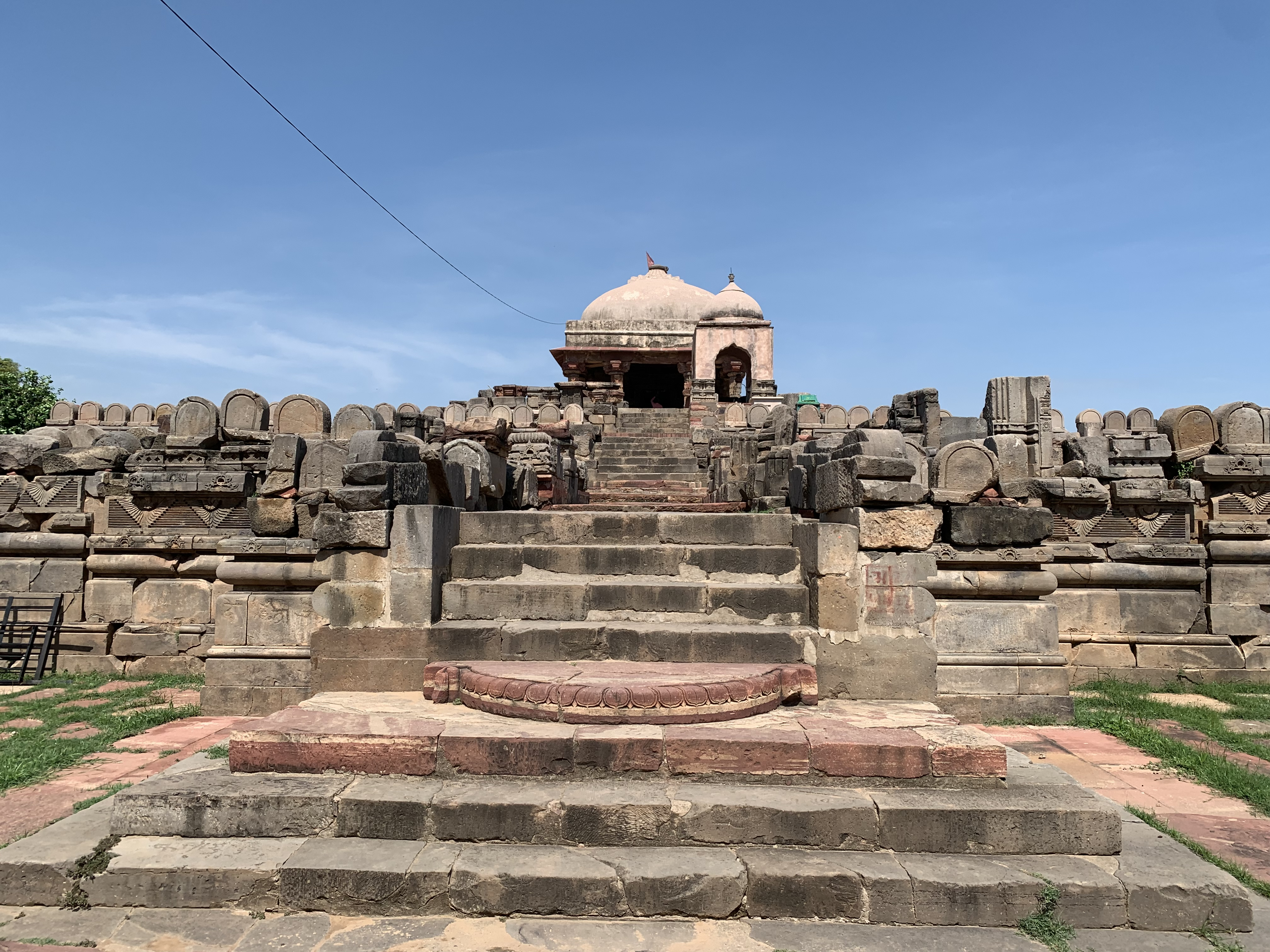
- Front facade of the temple ruin

- Location within Rajasthan

Religion
- Affiliation: Hinduism
- District: Dausa
- Deity: Lakshmi

Location
- Location: Abhaneri
- State: Rajasthan
- Country: India
- Interactive map of Harshat Mata ki Mandir
- Coordinates: 27°00′27″N 76°36′19″E

Architecture
- Style: Gurjara-Pratihara

The Harshat Mata Temple (IAST: Harṣat Mātā kā Mandir) is a Hindu temple in the Abhaneri (or "Abaneri") village of Rajasthan, in north-western India. The temple is dedicated to a goddess named Harshat Mata, although some art historians theorize it was initially a Vaishnavite shrine.

The original temple appears to have been built in the panchayatana style, which features a main shrine surrounded by four subsidiary shrines. Only parts of the main shrine now survive, and they have been ruined and modified over several centuries, with the tall shikhara tower replaced by a roof-dome. Much of the platform survives, with fragments of carved stones from the original structure, but most of the sculptures have been removed to the museums in Amber and Jaipur.

No epigraphic evidence survives regarding the temple's construction. The analysis of its architectural and sculptural style suggests it was built in the early 9th century, shortly after the adjoining Chand Baori stepwell was constructed. The temple's original builder is unknown, but historians theorize that it may have been built by a Gurjara-Pratihara king, possibly in association with a local Chahamana vassal. The temple is now protected by the Archaeological Survey of India, but remains in religious use.

== History ==
=== Date ===
The original Harshat Mata temple has been ruined and modified over several centuries. No epigraphic evidence regarding the temple's construction or the Chand Baori stepwell connected with it has been found. Based on similarities in style and carvings with the terraced temples of Paranagar and Mandore, the Chand Baori can be dated to the 8th-9th century. The Chand Baori was likely constructed before the temple, which can be dated to the 9th century based on stylistic grounds. Art historian Michael W Meister of the University of Pennsylvania dates the temple complex to c. 800–825 CE based on architectural details.

=== Dedication ===
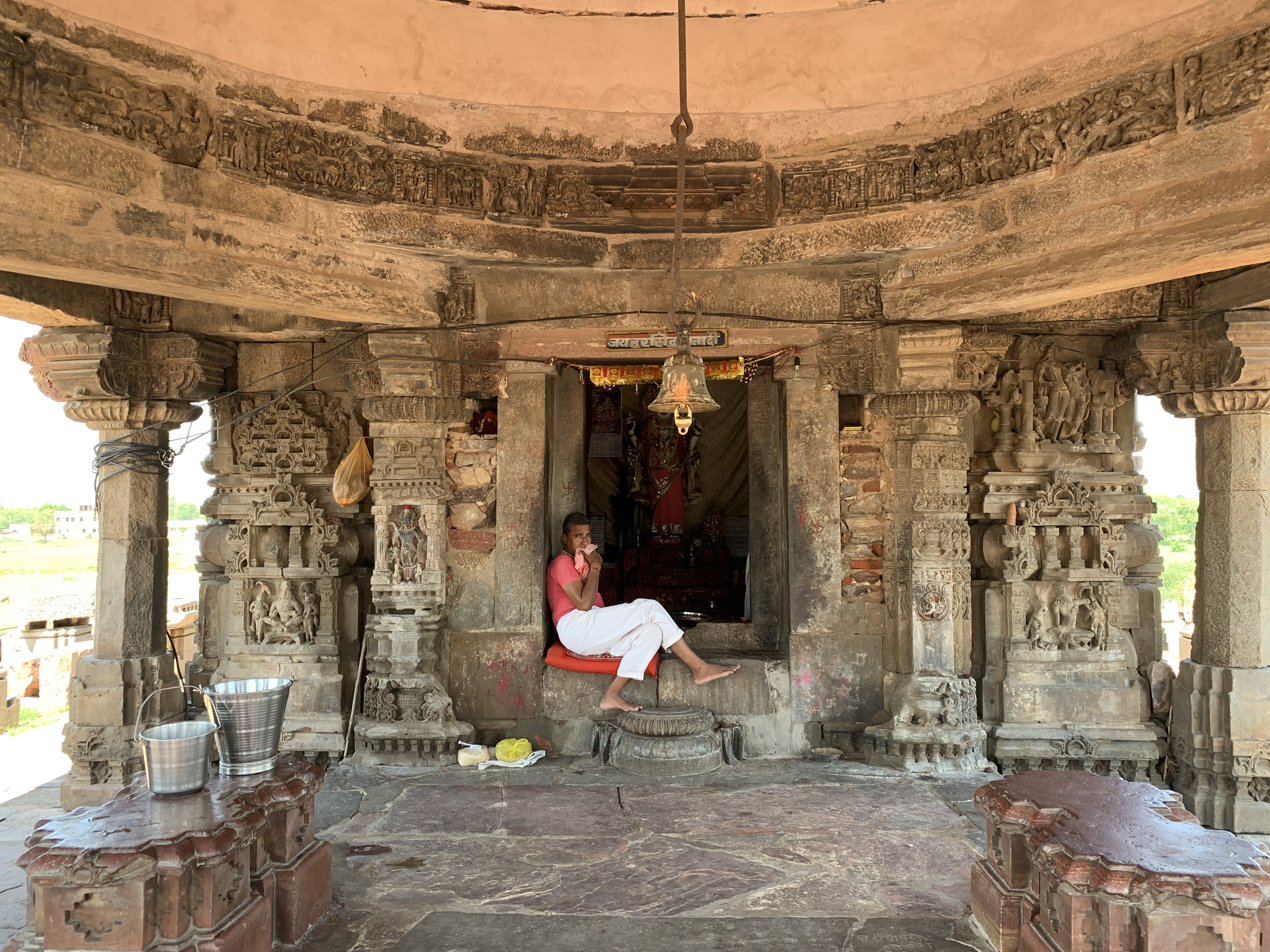
The entrance to the temple's active garbhagriha

Based on analysis of sculptures at the temple, art historians such as Meister and R. C. Agrawala (1991) theorize that the temple was originally a Vaishnava shrine. Art historian Cynthia Packert Atherton (1995) theorizes that the temple's iconography represents the Pancharatra movement of Vaishnavism. However, Falk Reitz (1993) of the University of Bonn believes the temple was always a Shakta temple dedicated to a goddess (Devi). Reitz associates several sculptural fragments from Abhaneri (now kept in various museums) with the Harshat Mata temple, and concludes that these fragments show strong Shakta and Shaiva influence. According to Reitz, this is not surprising, since Durga and Parvati (Shiva's wife) are considered different aspects of the same goddess. Reitz states that the Vaishnava sculptures at the temple have a "subordinate position" and cannot be used to make any conclusions about the temple's sectarian affiliation. According to him, panchayatana temples tend to be syncretic, and it is not surprising to find Vaishnava or Shaiva sculptures at a Shakta temple.

According to Reitz, the two fragments of a Durga sculpture discovered in the Chand Baori compound may have belonged to the main idol of the original temple. This sculpture appears to have been a 1.5-metre (4 ft 11 in) high statue of Durga in her Mahishasura-mardini (killer of the buffalo demon) form. The bigger fragment shows the lower part of Durga's torso with her left leg, her lion vahana, a male attendant, and a beheaded buffalo. The smaller fragment shows six right arms of the multi-armed Durga, with one of the arms pulling an arrow from the quiver; it also features the remains of a halo in the form of a lotus leaf, and two gandharvas (heavenly beings). Reitz points out that the intact sculpture would have been similar to the idol in the Pipala-devi Temple at Osian, which, like the Harshat Mata temple, has been dated to 800–825 CE by Meister.

=== Builder ===
The builder of the original temple is unknown. According to Agrawala, the sculptures are representative of the early Gurjara-Pratihara art. Reitz theorizes that the temple may have been constructed under the patronage of a local Chahamana prince (possibly Guvaka I) with the support of his Gurjara-Pratihara overlord (possibly Nagabhata II). He notes that Shakambhari – the tutelary deity of the Chahamanas – has been identified as a form of Durga, and the Bhagavati Barah copper-plate inscription states that Bhagavati (another form of the goddess) was one of the tutelary deities of Nagabhata II. Atherton notes that the lack of adequate historical information prevents attribution of the temple to a particular ruler with certainty, but it is more likely that the Gurjara-Pratiharas – not the Chahamanas – were the patrons of the temple, with Nagabhata II being the best candidate.

=== Modern history ===
In the 20th century, the sanctum had a Durga idol, which was stolen. It was replaced with an idol of goddess Lakshmi, who is now worshipped as Harshat-Mata.

The temple remains in religious use, inscribed by the Archaeological Survey of India under the Act No. LXXI of 1951, dated 28 November 1951.

== Architecture ==
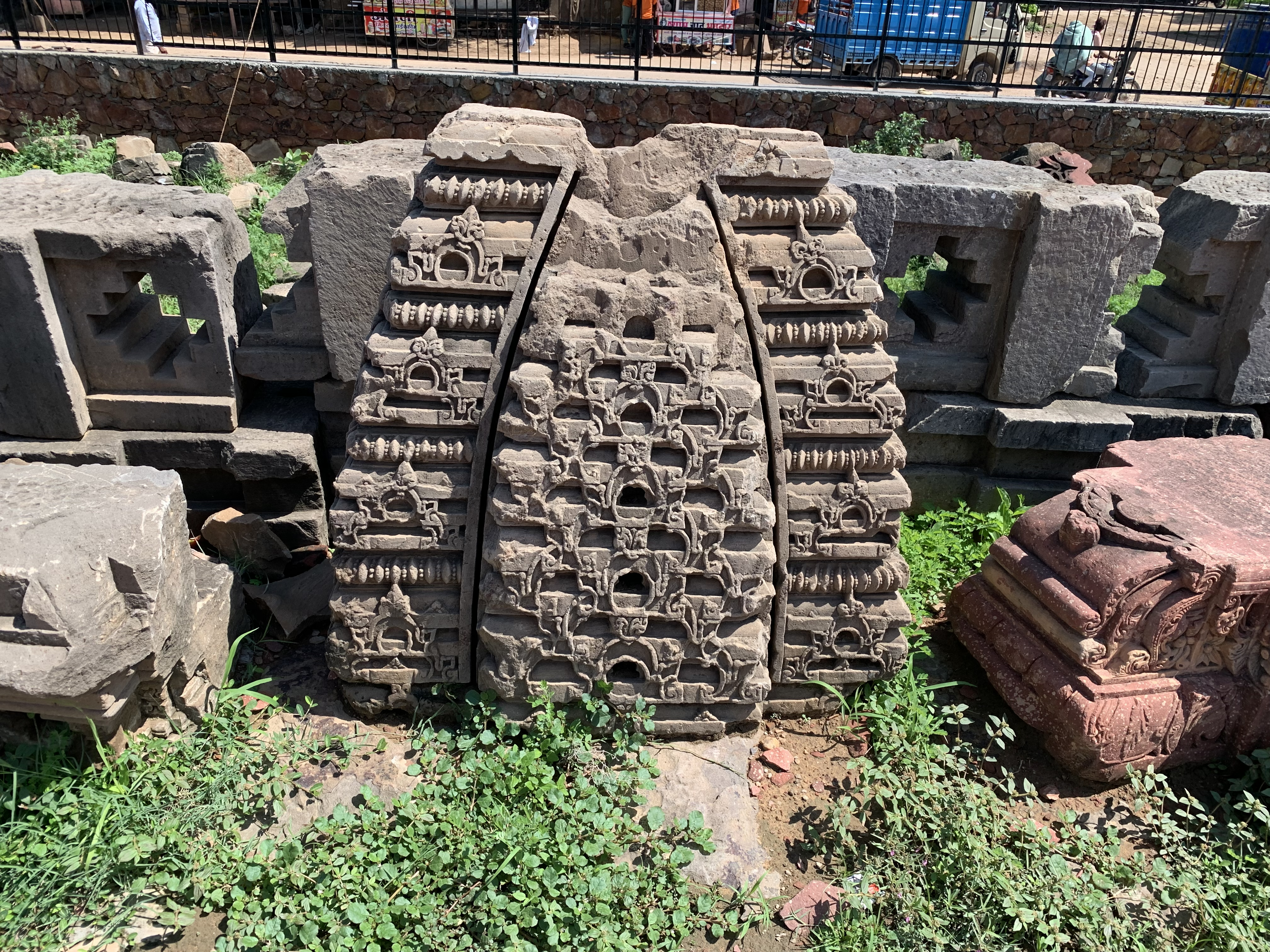
A stone sculpture in the ruins depicting the possible shikhara appearance, the temple was once crowned

The original temple appears to have been built in the panchayatana style, which features a main shrine surrounded by four subsidiary shrines. Though ruined and modified over several centuries, parts of the main shrine and the bottom of an open mandapa with columns seem intact. Much of the platform survives, and carved stones from the original structure lie around it, but most of the sculptures have been removed to the museums in Amber, Rajasthan, and the Central Museum, Jaipur.

The entrance to the temple faces east, towards the rising sun. The temple complex is built on two broad stepped terraces (jagati), which originally included a circumambulatory path, but is now partially ruined. The boundary of the lower terrace has a relatively plain set of foundation and base moldings (vedibandha), which have decorative patterns at the top. The ruins of two small shrines flank the entrance stairway. The upper terrace is far more decorated, but is largely destroyed; the only image that remains intact is of Narasimha flanked by warriors.

The four subsidiary shrines may have been located on the upper terrace. Frank Reitz, who believes that the main idol of the temple was always that of Durga, theorizes that the four subsidiary shrines were located to Surya (north-west corner), Ganesha (north-east corner), Karttikeya (south-east corner), and Lakshmi-Narayana or Uma-Maheshvara (south-west). Reitz's theory is based on an analysis of other contemporary and near-contemporary temples, as well as a study of various fragments found at the Chand Baori compound or housed at various museums.

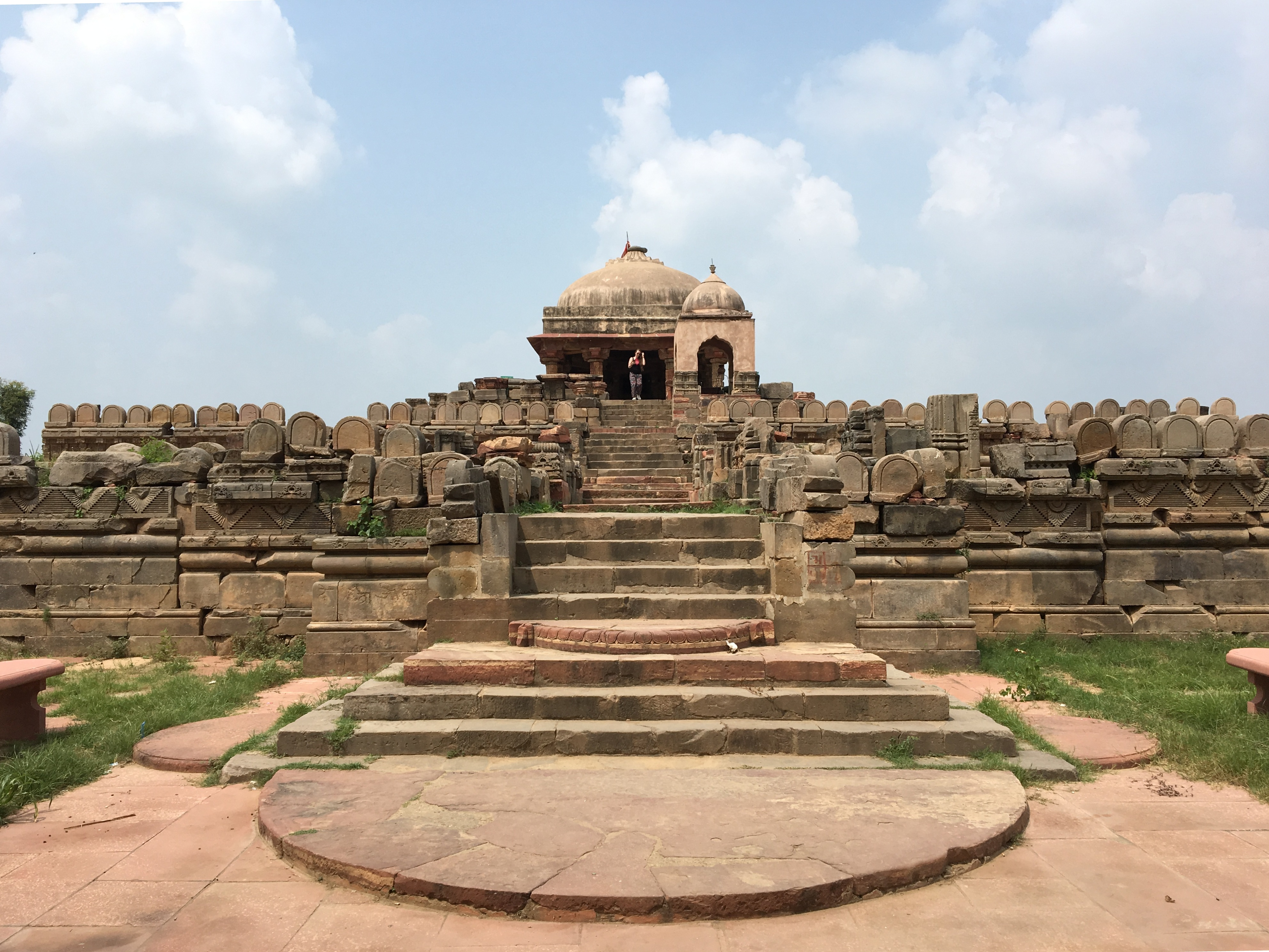
Entrance stairs

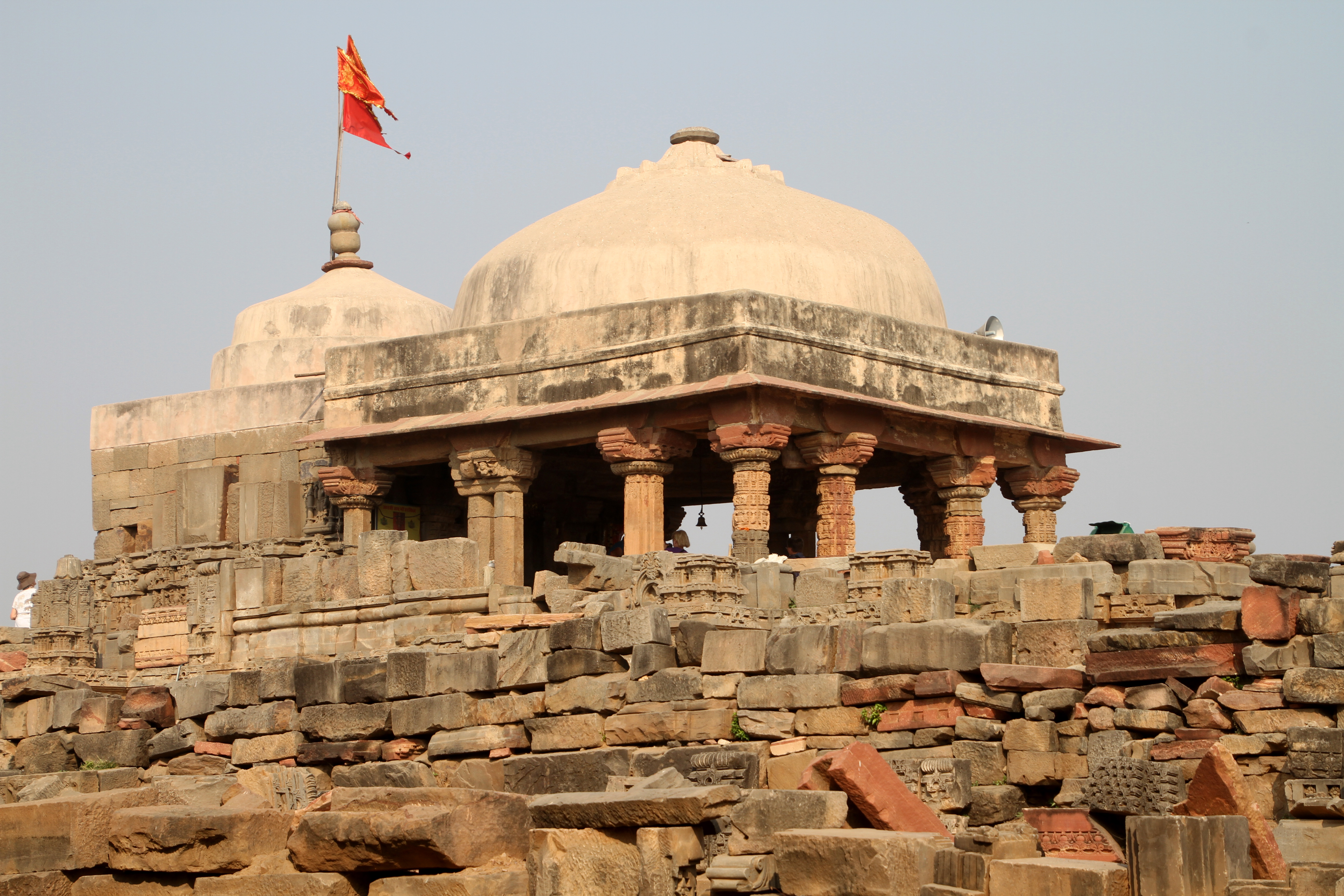
Main dome around the garbhagriha

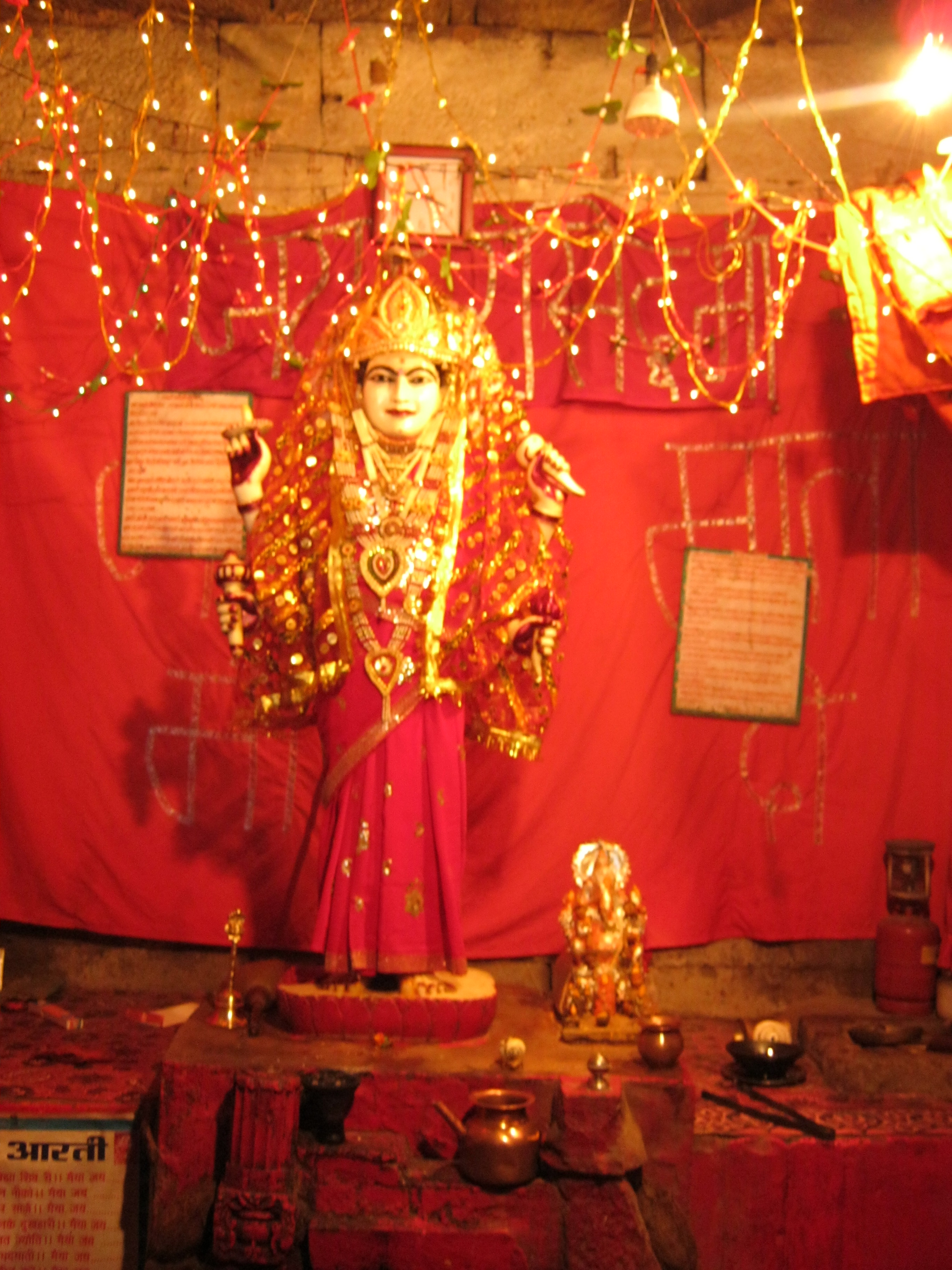
Harshat Mata's image in the sanctum

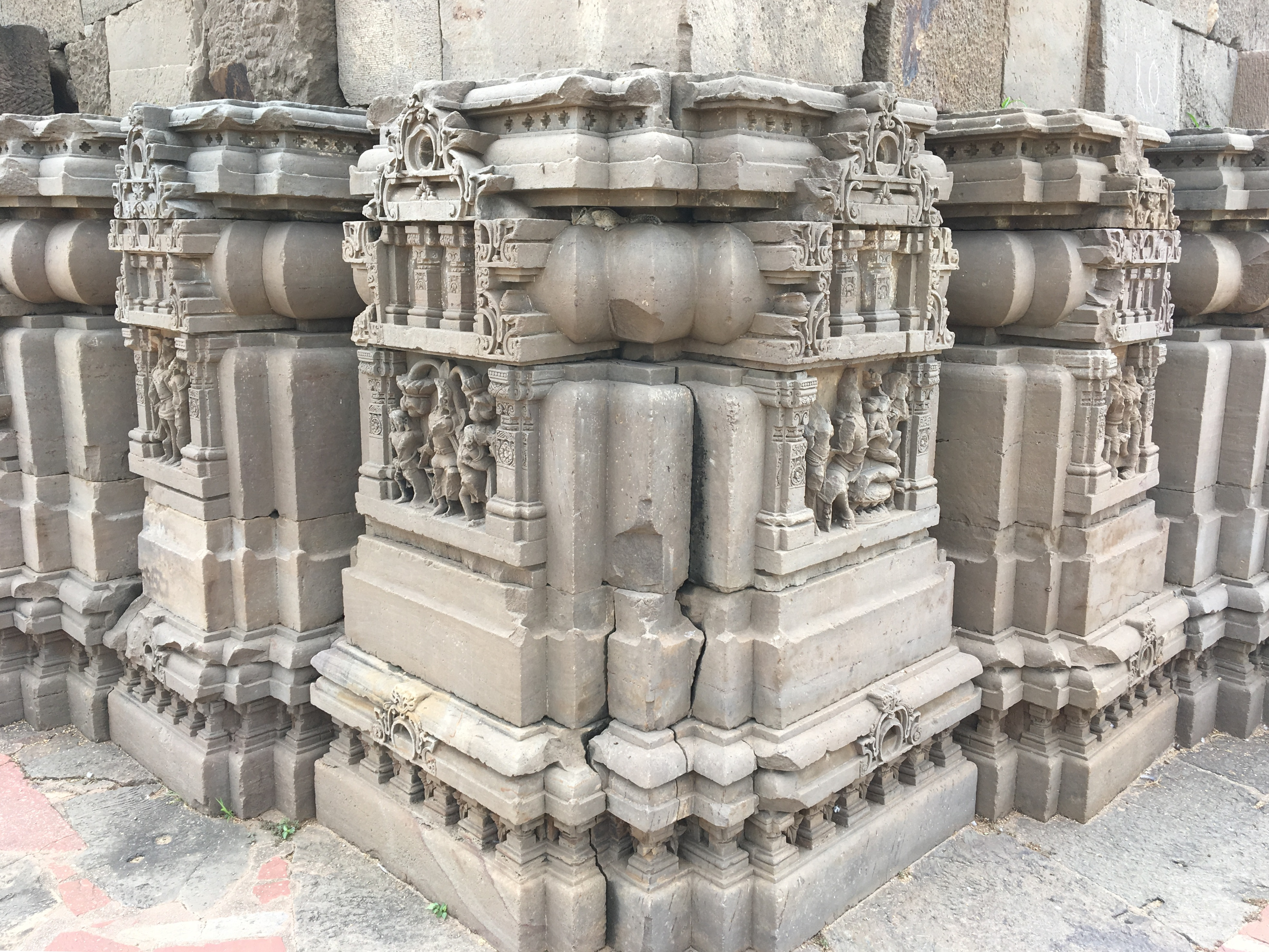
Stone carvings on the upper terrace

The main shrine is erected on a platform (mancha) located at the top of the two terraces. The platform is bounded by a circumambulatory path (sandhara), connected to a pillared porch (gudhamandapa). The original path and the porch have been destroyed and rebuilt haphazardly. The platform features figures engaged in amorous activities, which seem to be depictions of encounters between a royal figure and his consorts. According to art historian Cynthia Packert Atherton (1995), these are an idealized portrayal of the temple's royal patron, and are symbolic of Vishnu's reign on earth, thus reinforcing the idea of divine kingship.

Several sculptural fragments were found at the compound of the adjoining Chand Baori stepwell; the format and dimensions of these fragments suggest that they were once attached to the base moldings on the circumambulatory path. The majority of these fragments feature Shaivite images, including those of Shiva in various forms such as Ardhanarishvara, his wife Parvati, their son Karttikeya, and Shiva's bull Nandi. There is no evidence of any Shaivite shrine having existed in the temple complex. The Harshat Mata temple is now a Devi shrine, and is theorized to have originally been a Vaishnavite shrine; therefore, these fragments' iconographic significance is unclear.

Sculptures and decorative motifs

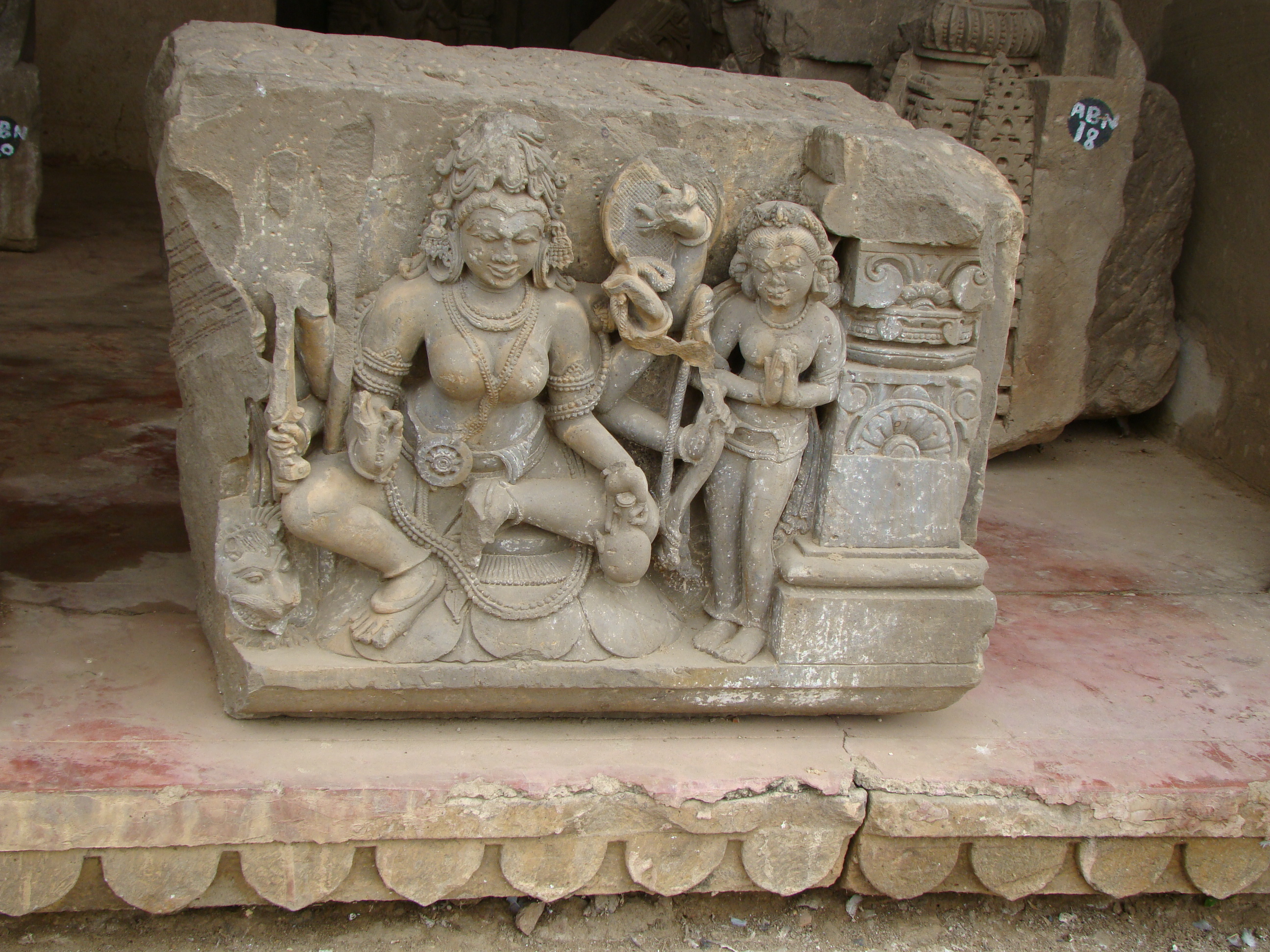
Goddess

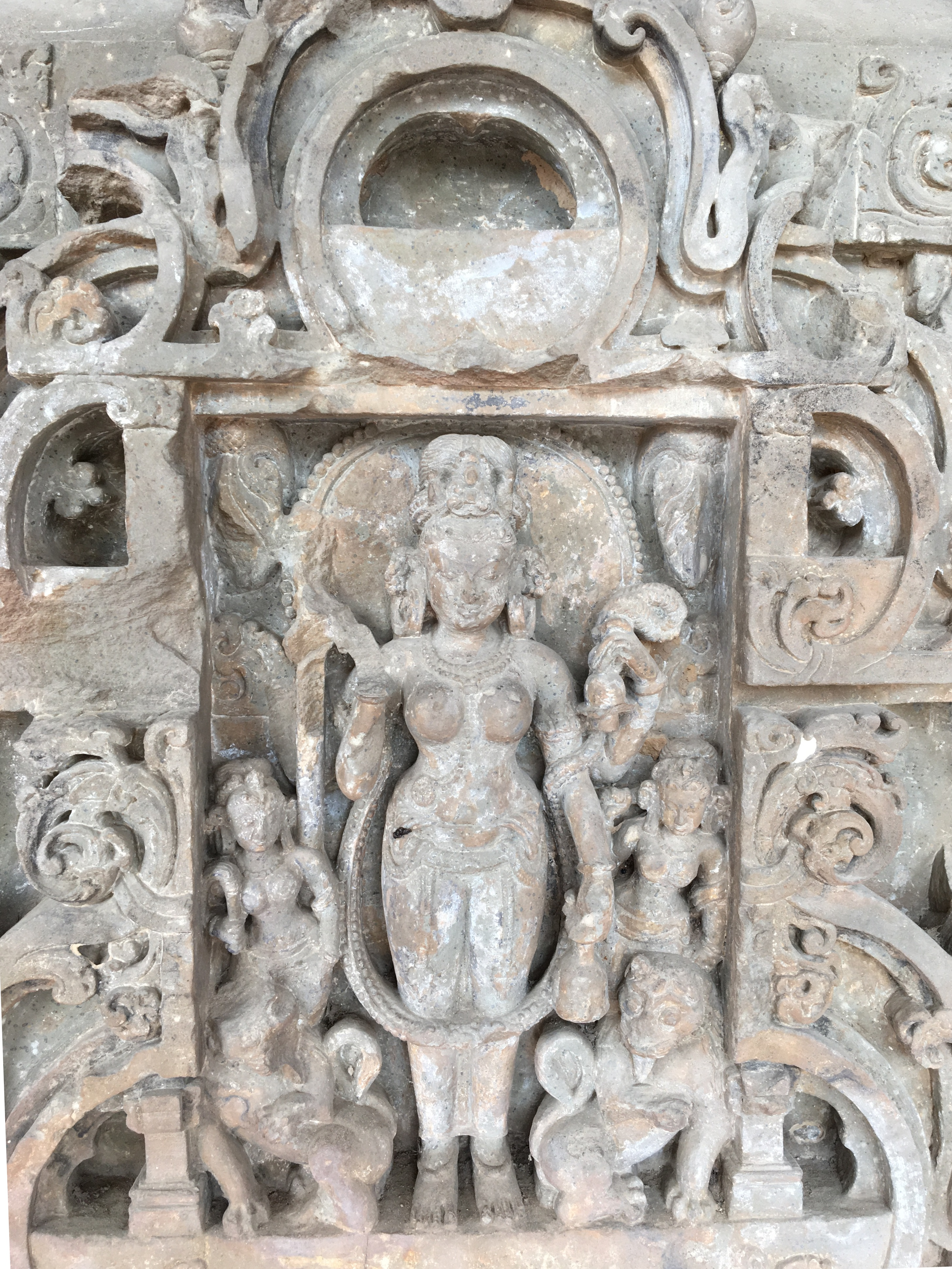
Deity

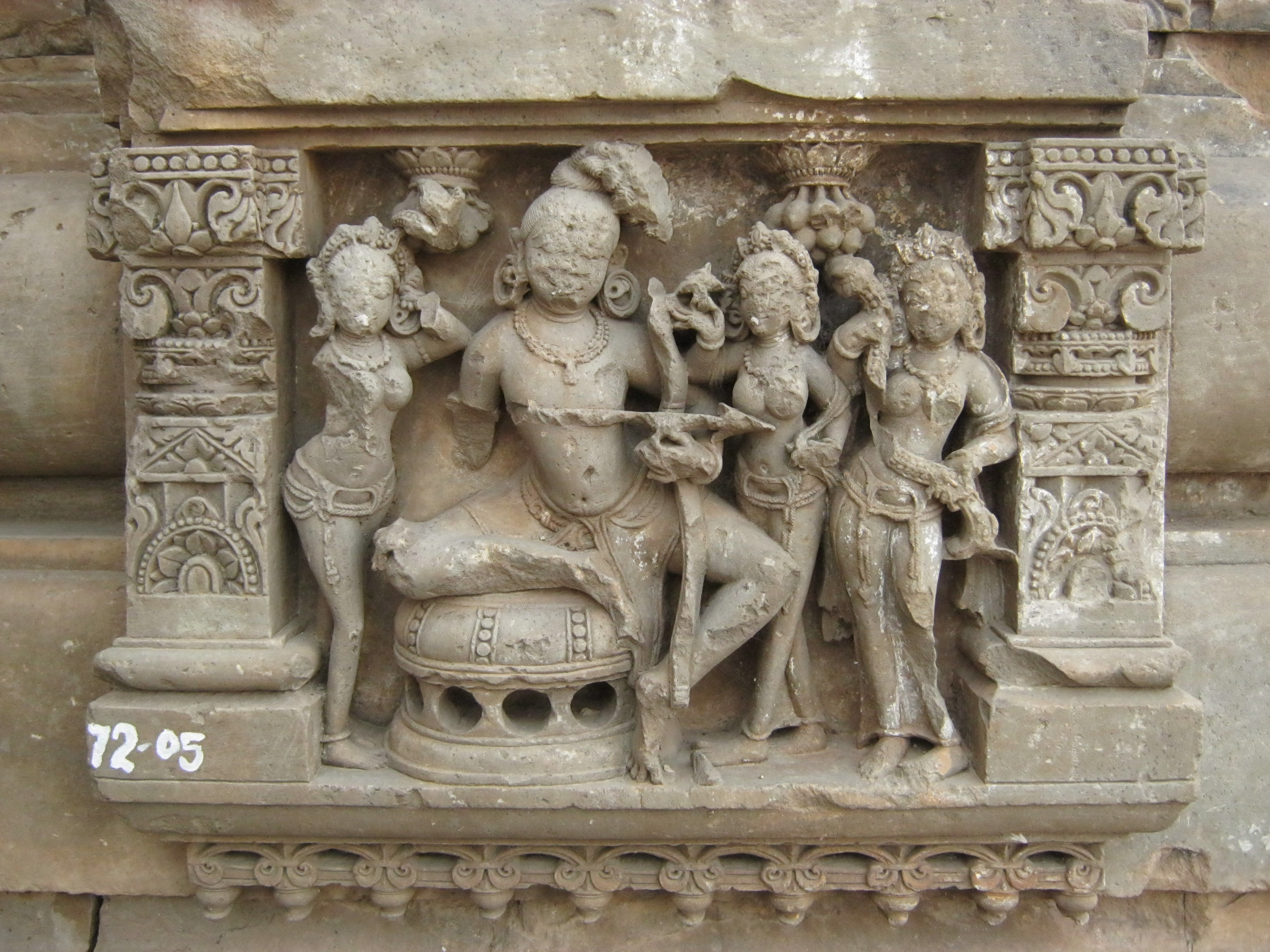
Man with bow and arrow

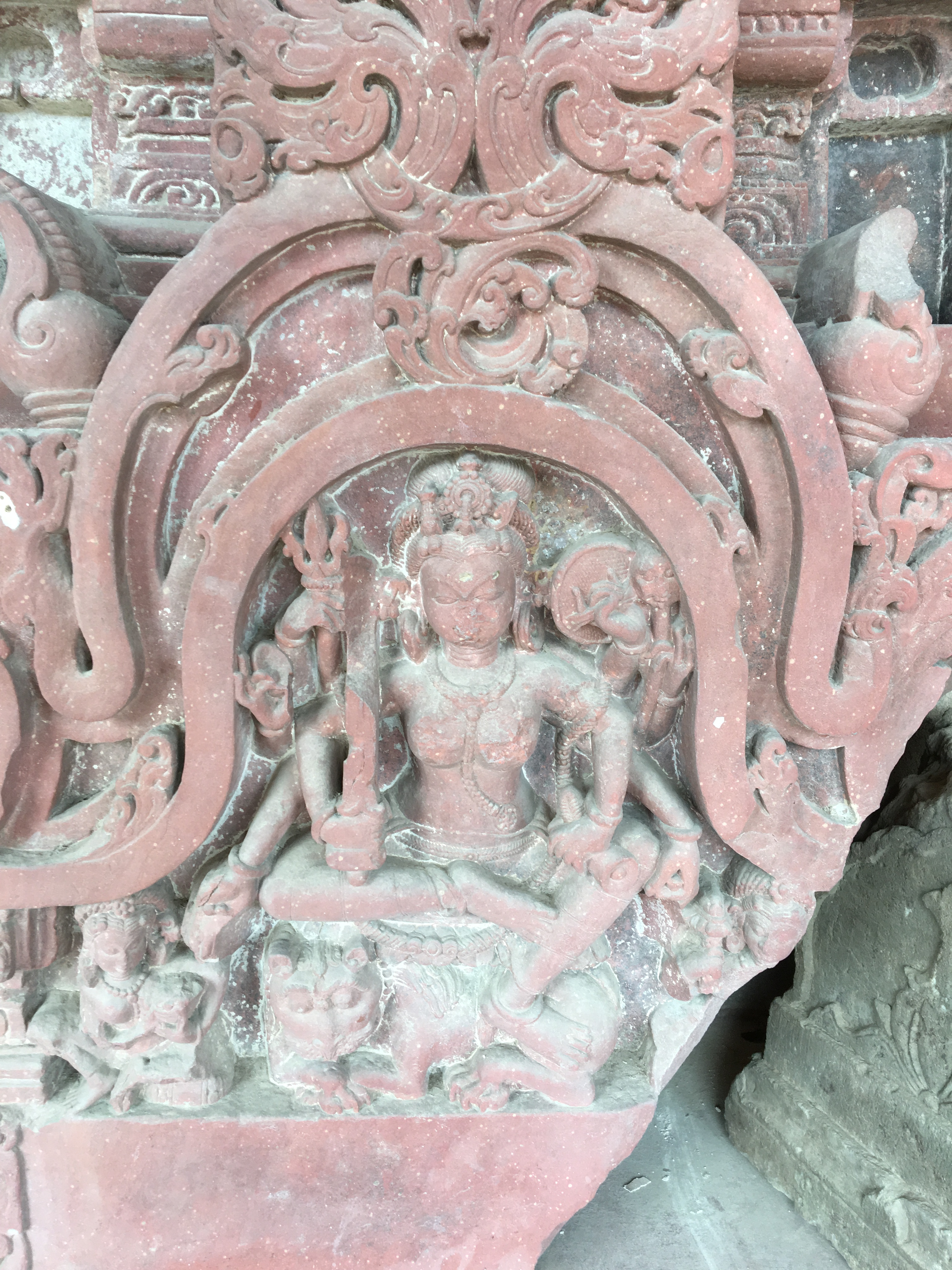
Seated deity

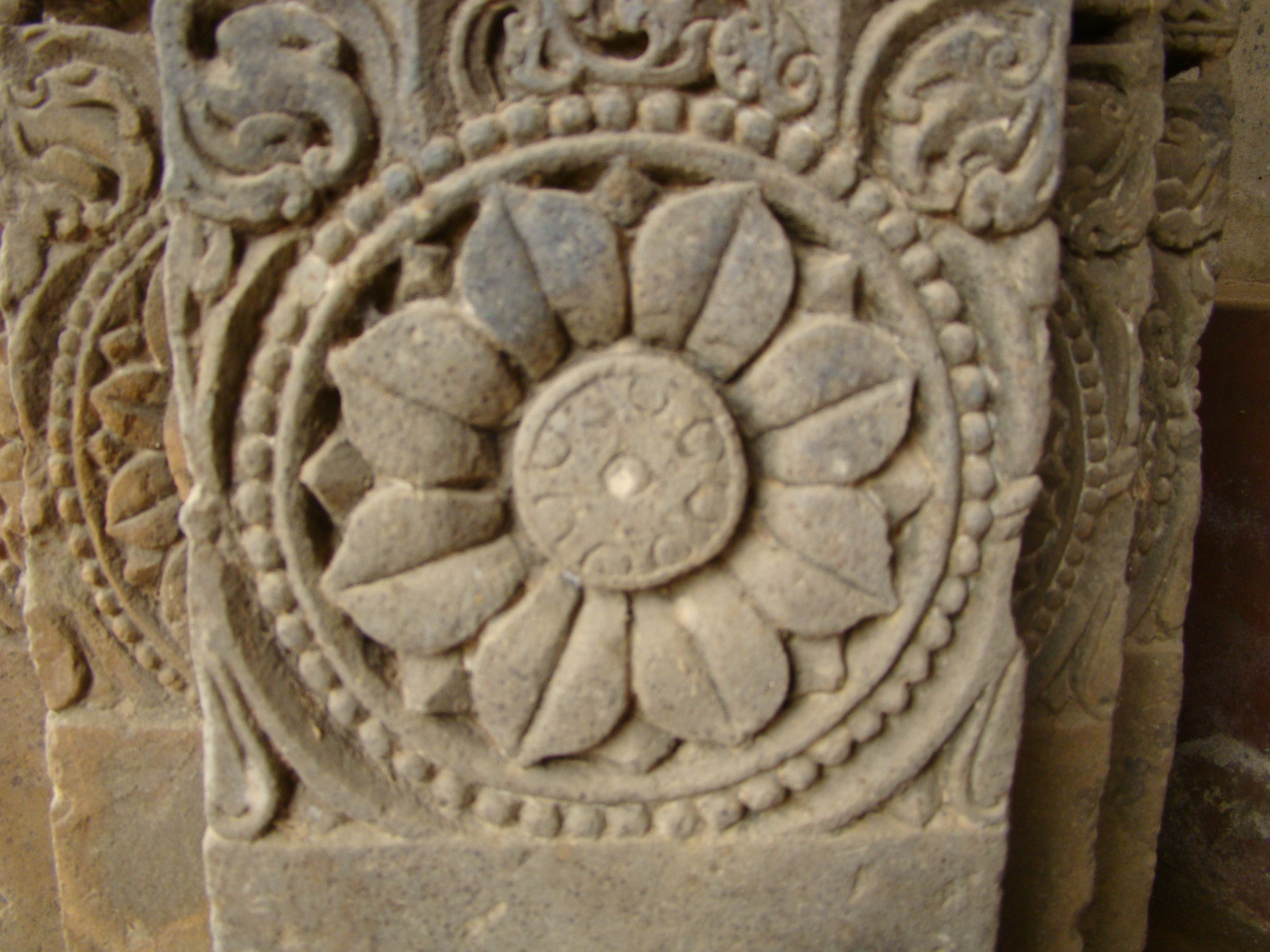
Carved flower sculpture

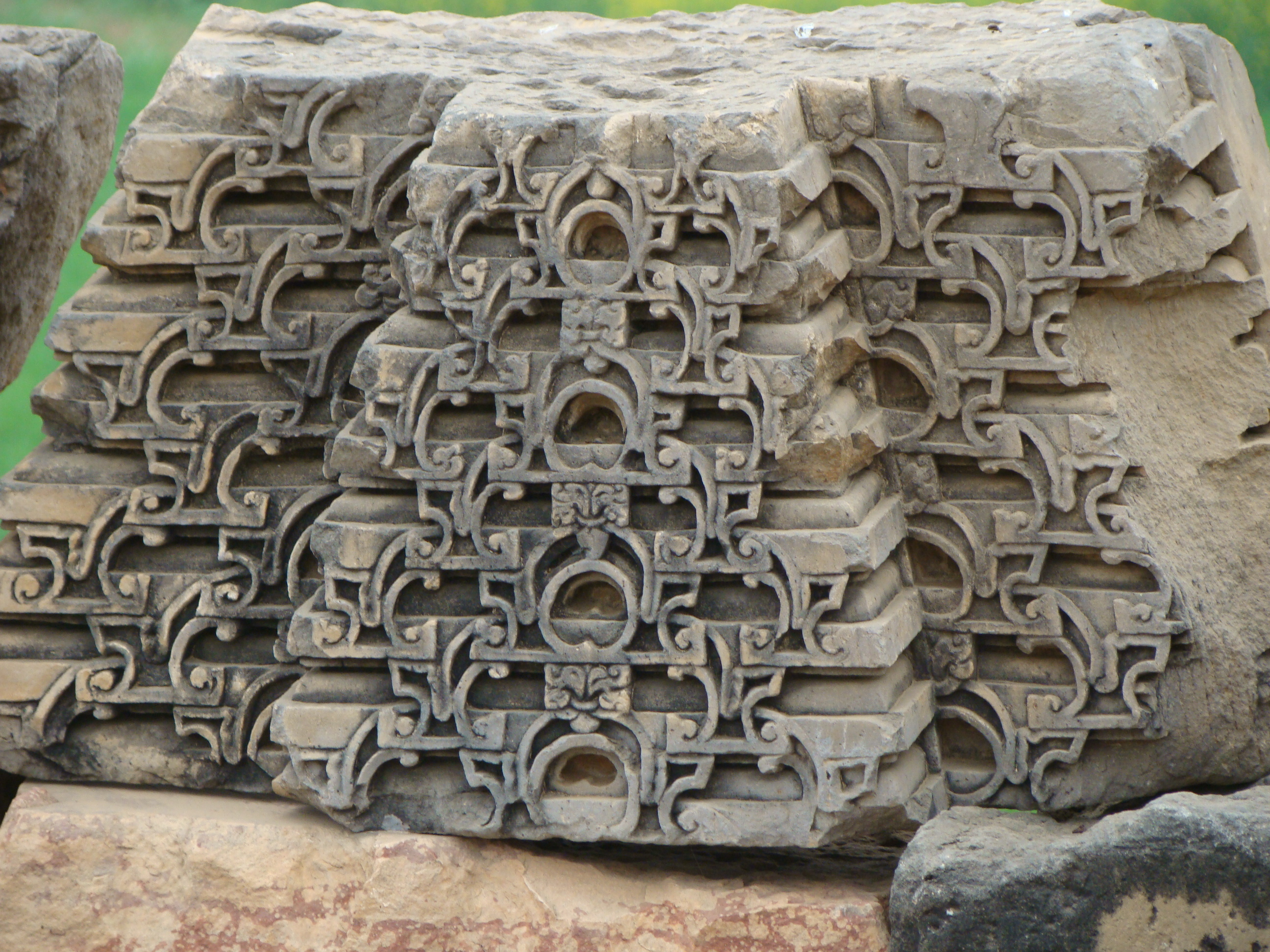
Crated mound

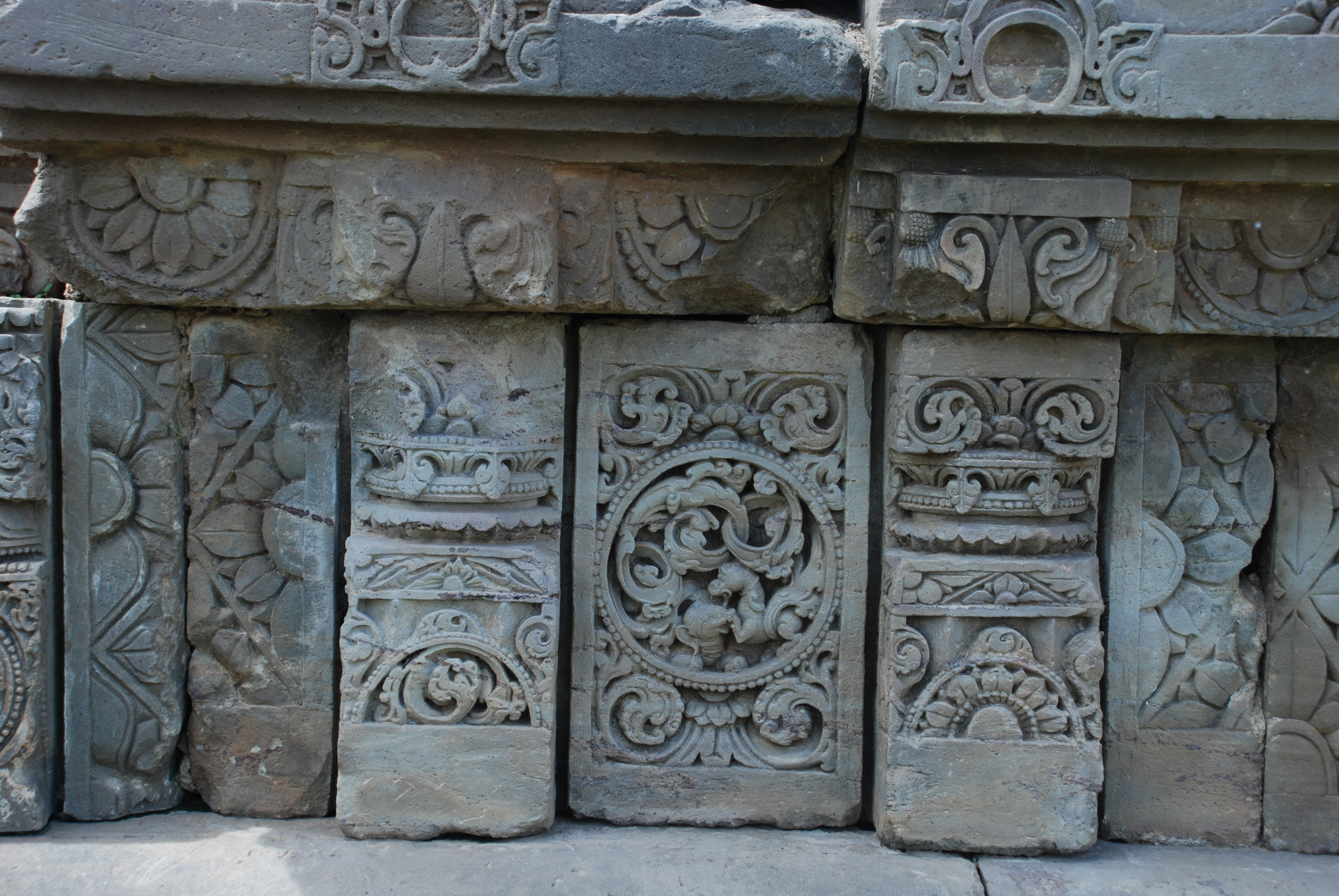
Sculpted slabs

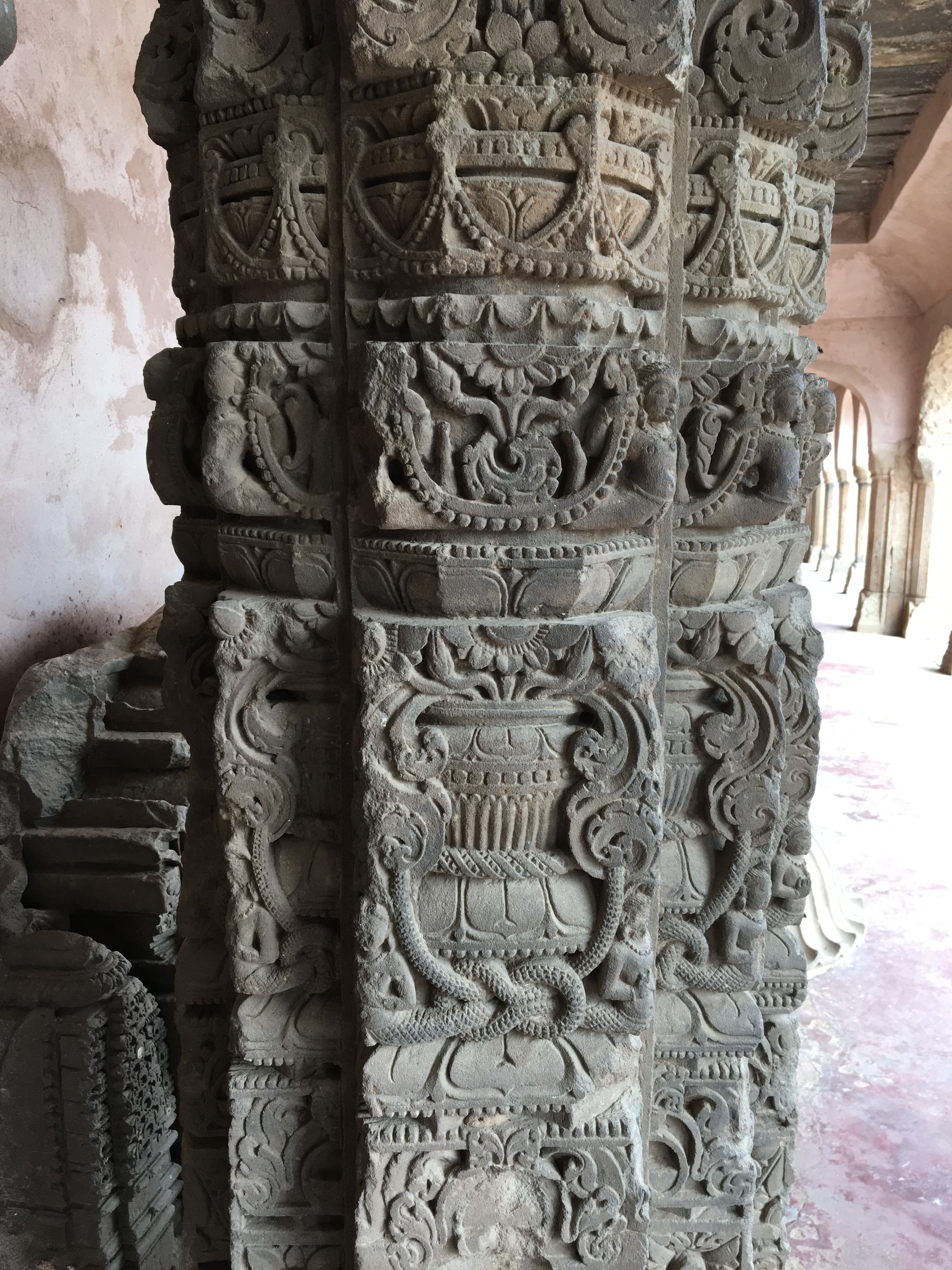
Pillar

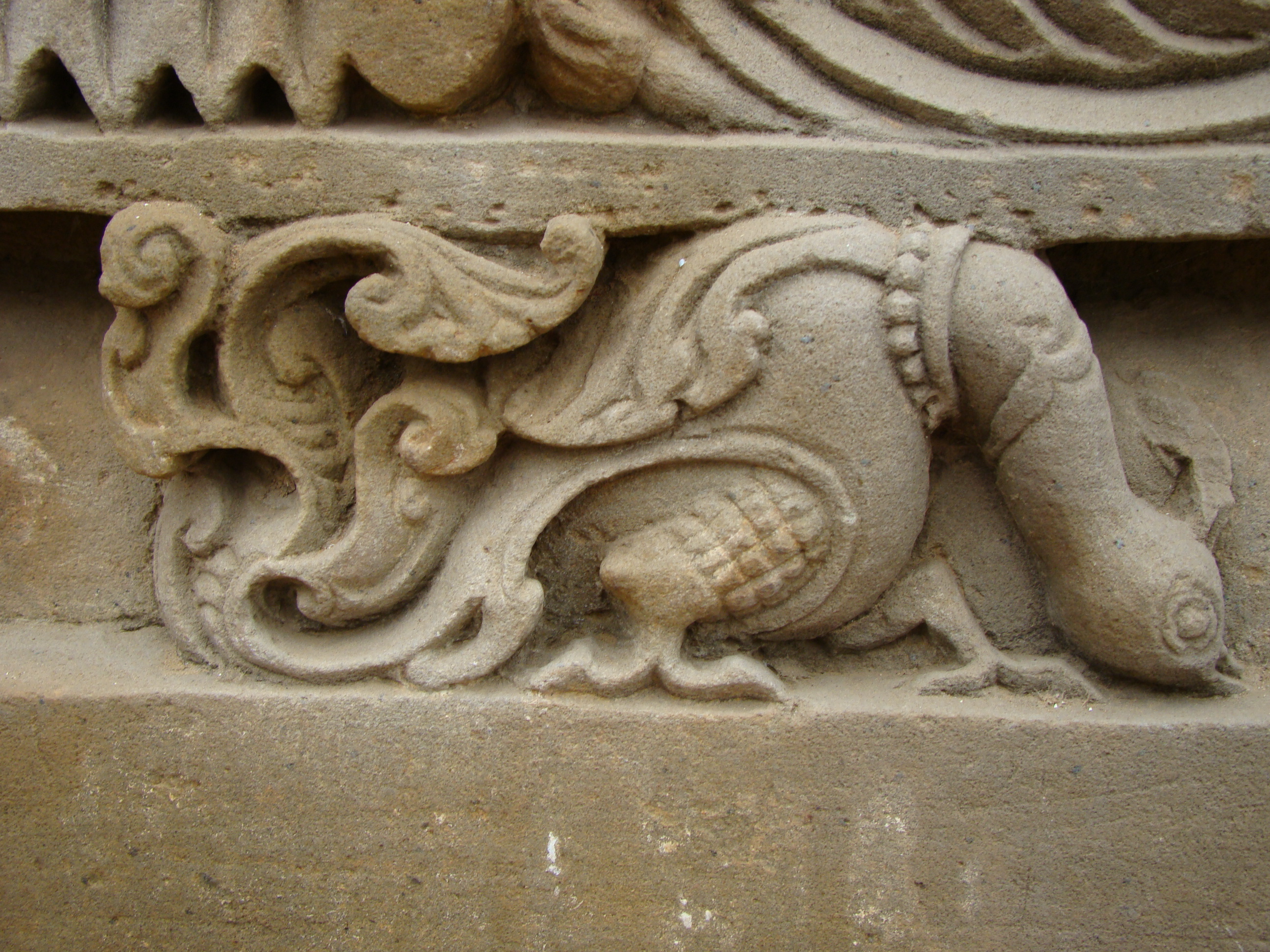
Carved peacock sculpture

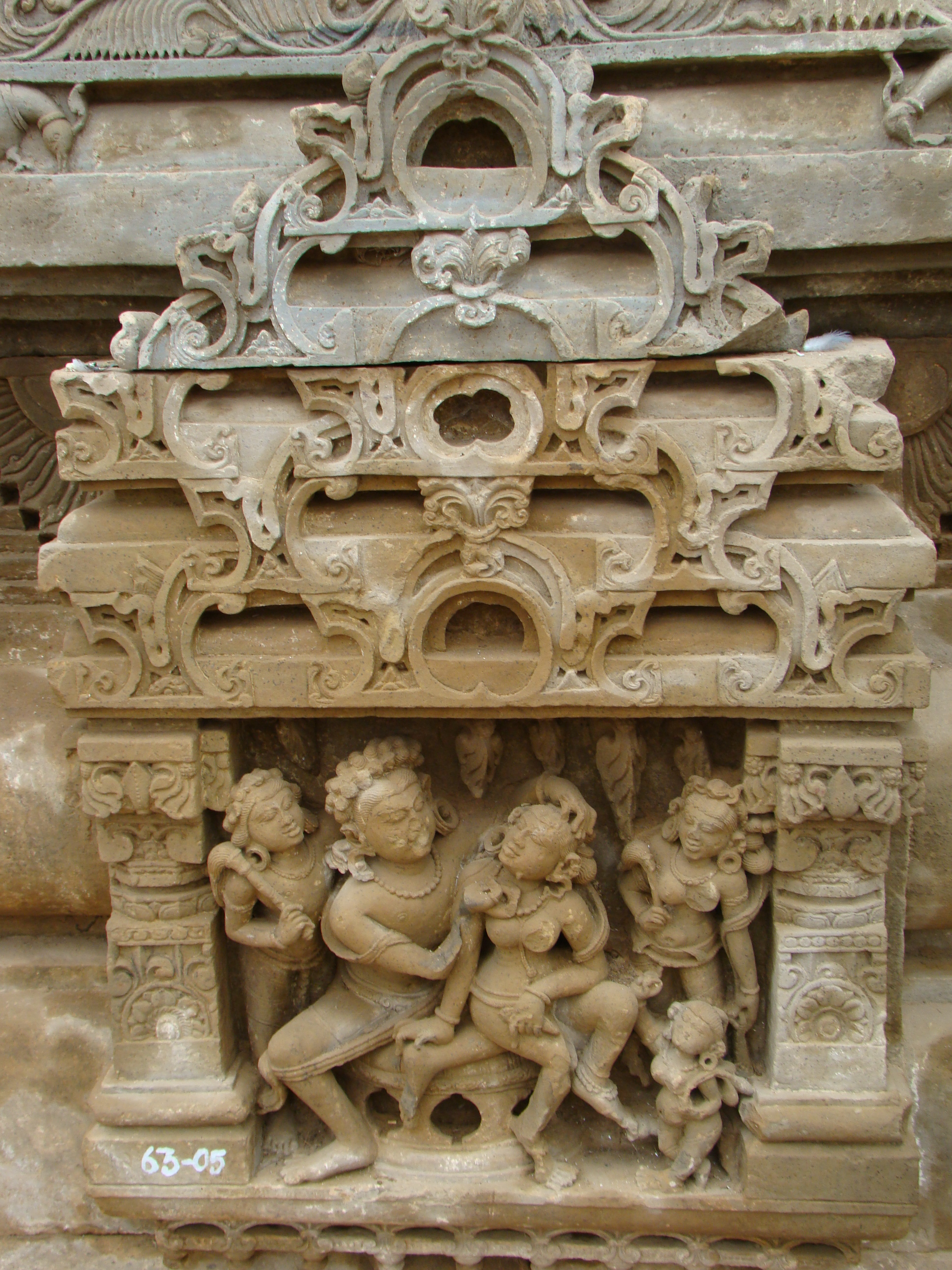
Amorous activities

The original main shrine was much taller and had a superstructure (shikhara) tower. However, the superstructure has been destroyed and later rebuilt with a simple dome. The sculptures on the temple walls have largely been lost: the surviving sculptures include those of Vishnu, his vahana - the Garuda, Balarama, apsaras (celestial woman), a vyala (leogryph), Agni, a four-armed Shiva-like seated male, a male seated on a makara (mythical sea creature), a kneeling male having his foot massaged by four female attendants, dancers, and a musician, among others.

According to art historian Cynthia Packert Atherton, these images can be explained with reference to the Vishnu worship as described in the Pancharatra texts. These texts characterize various manifestations of the Vishnu successively emanating from his highest form, Vasudeva; his brother Samkarshana (Balarama) emanates from Vasudeva; his son Pradyumna emanates from Balarama; and his grandson Aniruddha emanates from Pradyumna.

The temple's inner structure has a pancharatha sanctum (garbhagriha): it has an idol of Harshat Mata that was not present in the original temple.

== See also ==
- Harshnath Temple, constructed during the reign of Chahamana king Vigraharaja II
