= Abhaneri =

Historical site in Rajasthan

Abhaneri City of Brightness Abaneri
- village
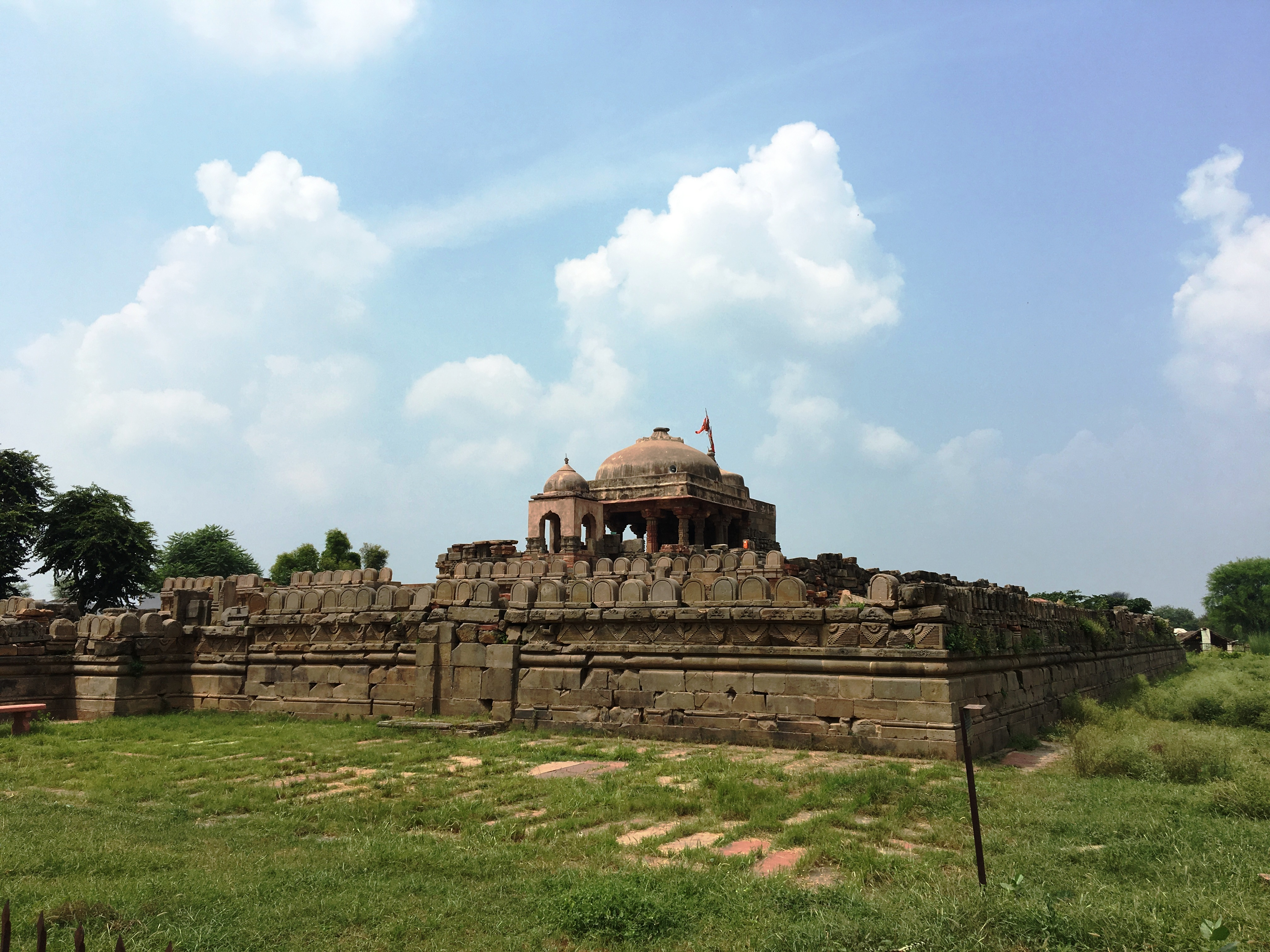
- Harshat Mata Temple in Abhaneri

- Location in Rajasthan, India Abhaneri (India)
- Coordinates: 27.00725°N 76.60594°E
- Country: India
- State: Rajasthan
- District: Dausa

Languages
  - Official: Hindi
- Time zone: UTC+5:30 (IST)
- ISO 3166 code: RJ-IN
- Vehicle registration: RJ-
- Coastline: 0 kilometres (0 mi)

Abhaneri, also spelled Abaneri, is a village in the Dausa district of the Indian state of Rajasthan, situated on the Jaipur-Agra Highway. Modern day Abhaneri contains the ruins of an ancient city, Abhangari, as well as the popular tourist sites of the Chand Baori step well and the Harshat Mata Temple. The site was first reported by B L Dhama in 1903 when he published a List of Objects of Antiquarian Interest in the States of Rajputana. Beside the step well and the temple, it has many examples of early (circa 8th-9th century CE) Pratihara art. Many sculptures from the area have been removed and are now contained in the collections of museums around India such as the Government Museum, Amber; the Albert Hall Museum, Jaipur; the Hawamahal City Palace; and the Archaeological Survey of India. The Indian Government issued a postal stamp depicting the Chand Baori in 2017.

== History ==
Abhaneri was originally named Abha Nagari, ("City of Brightness"), but over time the name evolved to its present form. Originally ruled by the Chahamanas of Shakambhari, the area was later conquered by Muslim invasions under Mahmud of Ghazni and later ruled by the Mughals. Later the Maratha conquered the area and it became a part of Jaipur State until independence. Abhaneri is small in size, but attracts tourists from across the globe. The site has attracted some scholarly attention. In 1955, Pupul Jayakar and R C Agrawal published two articles in Marg Magazine, followed by an exhaustive catalogue of sculptural art found in the region by Rajendra Yadav that was published in 2006.

This research points to the emergence of a new school of sculptural art that integrates the beliefs of Gurjara-Pratihara rulers into Classical Gupta art. Symbols of worship, such as the Sun shown as energy, Durga as Mahishasuramardini, and Shiva as destroyer and generator, are typical of the school. Secular elements such as references to music, depictions of various hairstyles, and natural scenes are also depicted in the carvings.

== Geography ==
Abhanari is located between the city of Bandikui and the town of Sikandra on the Jaipur-Agra highway, close to State Highway 25. To the right of the village flows the river Banganga. It is about 210 km south of Delhi, about 95 km from Jaipur, 90 km east of Jaipur, 40 km east-northeast of Dausa, and 5 km from Bandikui.

== Landmarks ==
In 1951, the Archaeological Survey of India (ASI) described an ancient mound in the vicinity of Abhaneri that yielded numerous objects of archaeological interest including many examples of red and grey slipware. There were also a large number of Jain artefacts found in the mound. Jain pattavalis (spiritual genealogies) mention many Jain temples with high shikharas (spires) in the region, and attribute their existence to the charitable work of a rich merchant named Deshal along with his son. The artifacts indicate that Jainism flourished at Abhaneri between the 8th and 10th centuries CE.

Abhaneri is famous for two important historical sites: the Chand Baori and the Harshat Mata Temple (the Harshatmata Mandir). Both are splendid examples of ancient Indian architecture. The Chand Baori is one of the most ancient, deepest and largest baoris (stepwells) in Rajasthan. The oldest parts of the structure date back to the 8th century, with significant additions made in the 18th century. The stepwell consists of three flight of stairs descending into the earth with a subterranean palace on one side. The flights of stairs and the palace are arranged in a square pattern with the well lying at the bottom. The flights of steps descends thirteen stories beneath ground level.

The Harshat Mata Temple is located near the Chand Baori. It was a ritual for pilgrims to wash their hands and feet at the Chand Baori before visiting the temple. The Temple is dedicated to Harshat Mata, the goddess of joy and happiness. It was constructed in the 8th century CE. Though it was substantially destroyed by Islamic invaders in the 10th century, the remains of the temple still include architectural and sculptural elements dating from the 8th-century. The temple is on a raised platform from allowing unrestricted views of nearby fertile regions. A small village nearby houses many artisans.

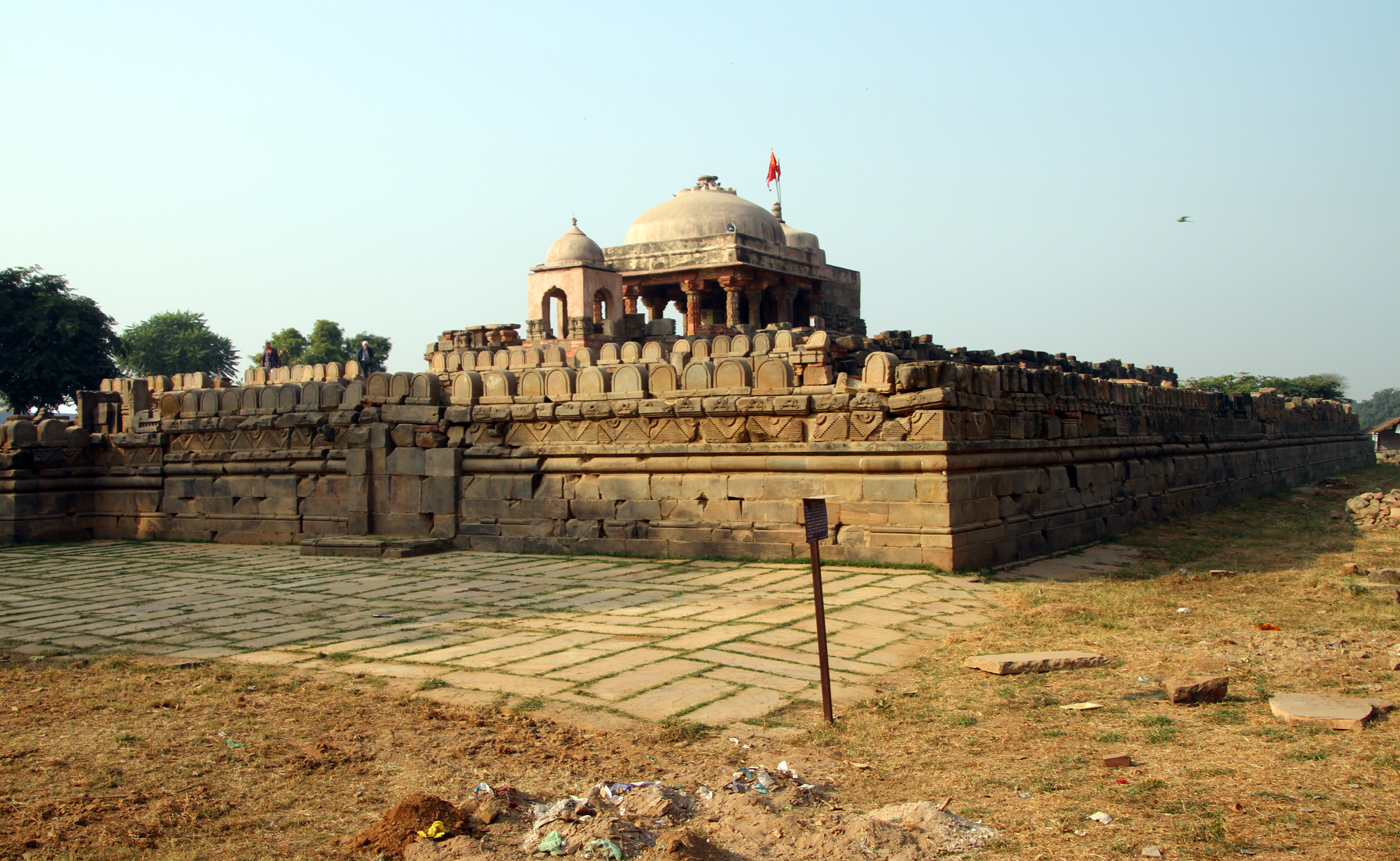
Harshat Mata Mandir, Abhaneri

The public's attention was drawn to Abhaneri and its step well during the early 2000s when the film Paheli was shot there. The film is based on a story written by Bijji (Vijaydan Detha). Environmental concerns about excessive water harvesting have also raised the public profile of Abhaneri and its step well.

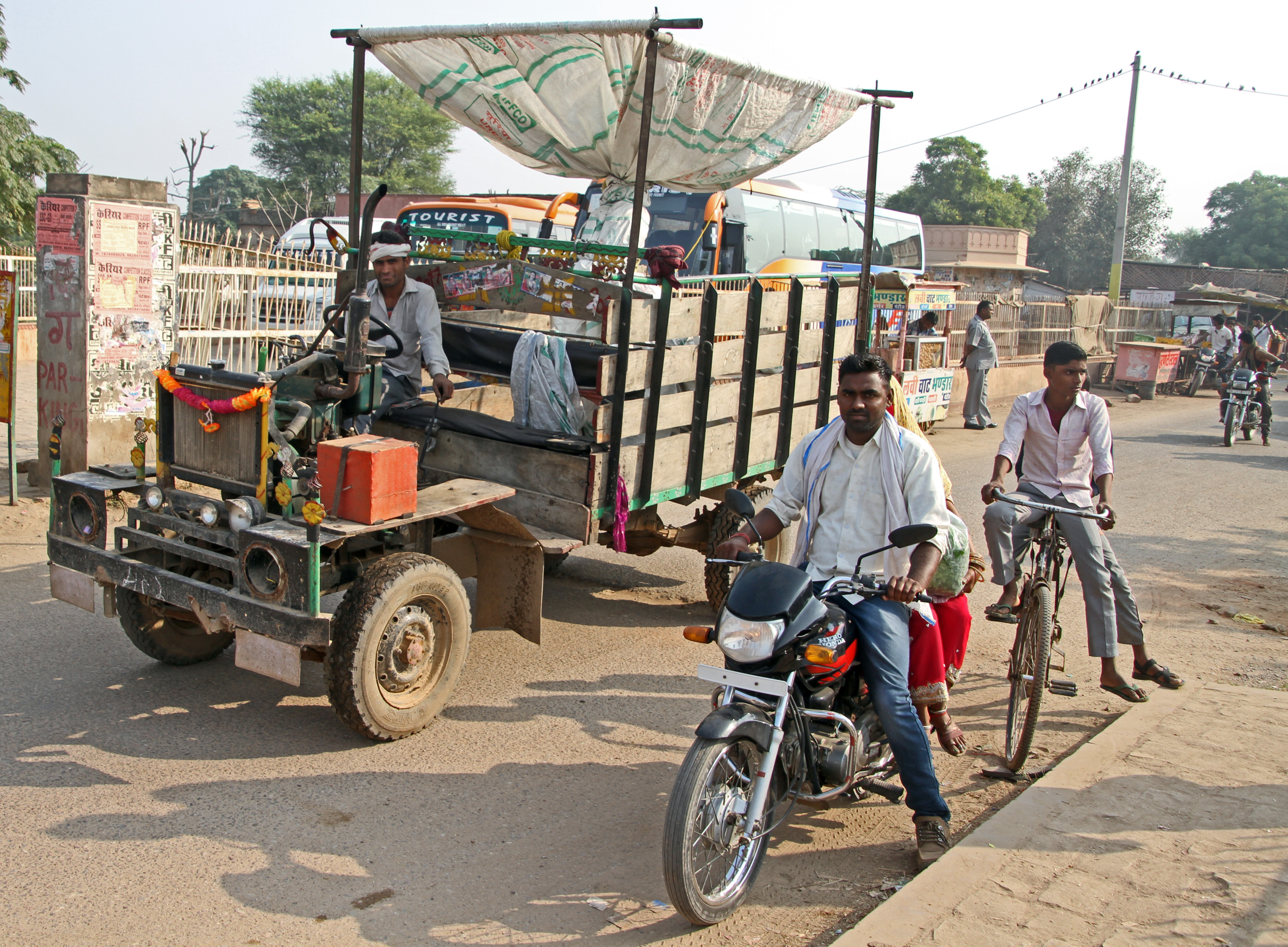
Bugga in Abhaneri

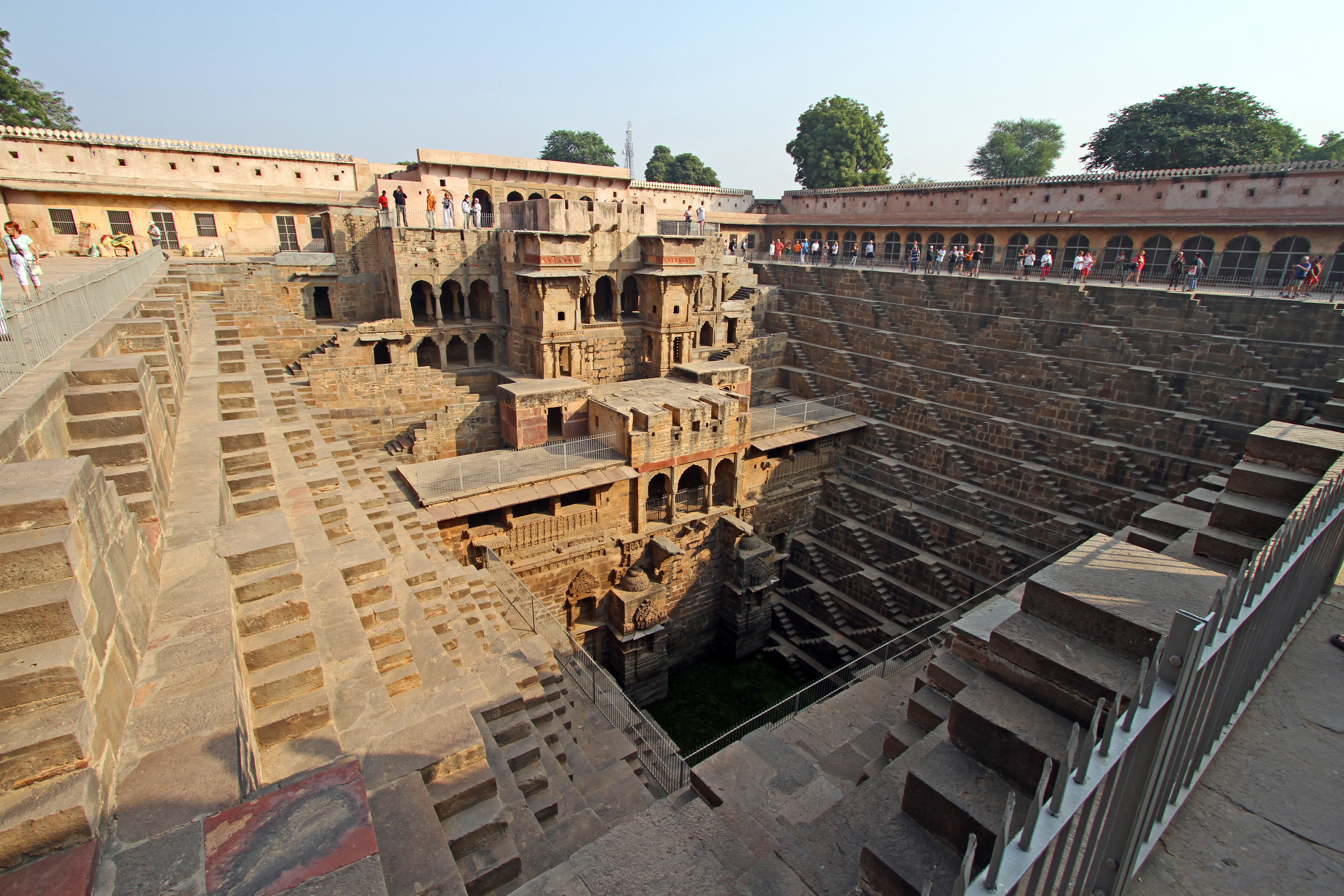
Chand Baori stepwell

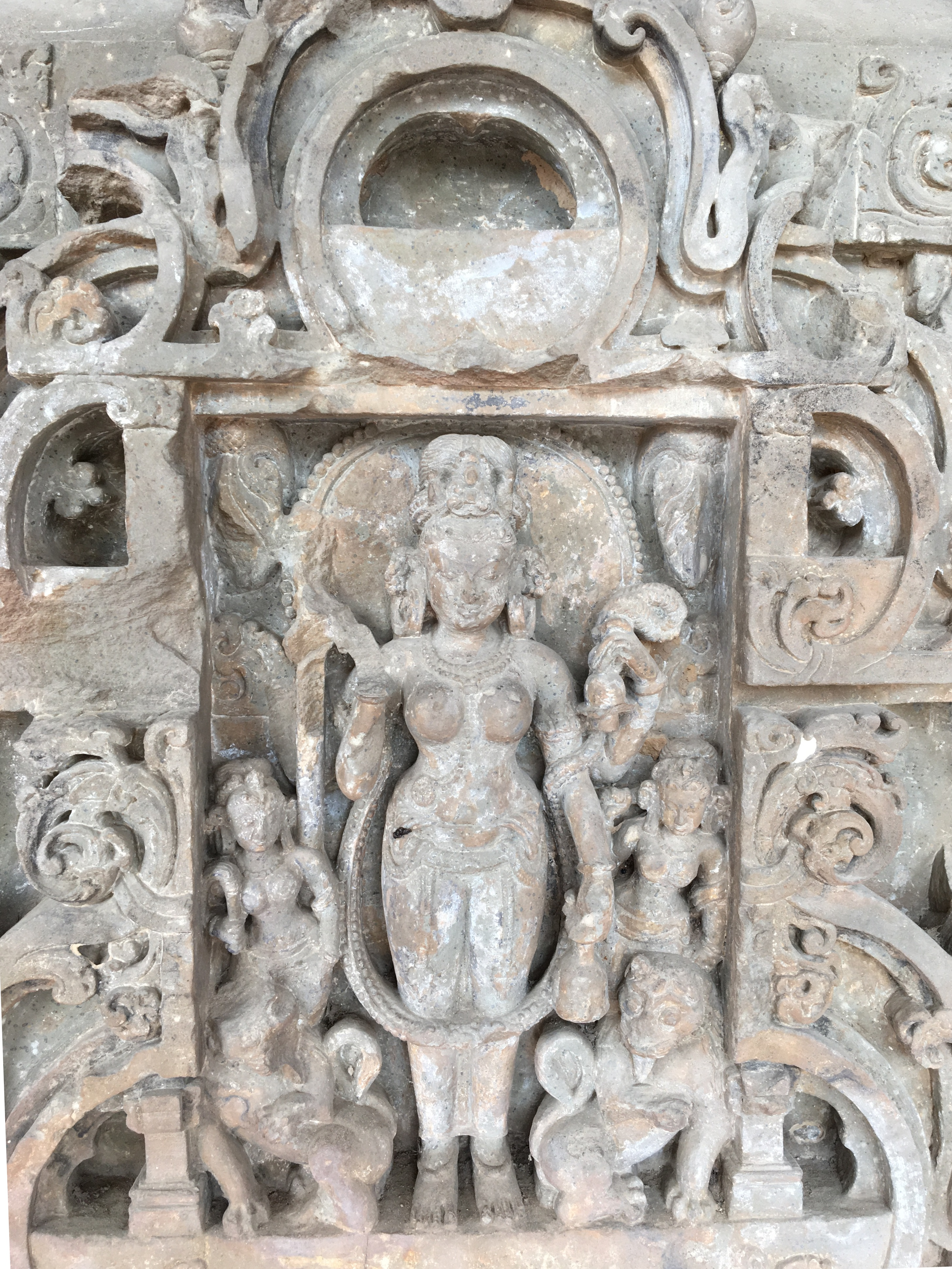
Carved stone sculptures of the Harshat Mata Temple
