= Martha Curnutt Casto =

Martha Curnutt Casto (c. 1812 - 1887) was sentenced to five years in Missouri State Penitentiary, an all-male prison, in 1843 after murdering her brutally abusive husband, Noah Casto, with an ax while he slept in Barry County, Missouri. Her experience in the Penitentiary roused enough support from political figures in the state to petition for her pardon, which was granted in 1844. The incident drew attention to the fact that an all-female prison was necessary.

== Early life ==
Martha was born about 1812 in Tennessee, the daughter of John Curnutt. On July 6, 1839, she married Noah Casto in Cole County, Missouri. Noah was from Pennsylvania and had been married at least twice before. Martha and Noah had two children together, a daughter named Mary and a son Noah, born about 1840 and 1842 respectively.

== Murder, imprisonment, and pardon ==
On the morning of July 10, 1843, Martha's husband Noah announced that she had better make breakfast and then say her prayers because he was going to kill her afterward, then went back to sleep. In fear for her life and believing it was "his life or hers", Martha picked up the firewood axe and brought it down on Noah's head as he slept, right through his eyes. She killed him with one blow. She then went to her neighbor and explained what had happened. She was convicted of first-degree manslaughter and sentenced to five years in Missouri State Penitentiary, where she was the only female prisoner out of about 800. Since she was not able to mix with the male prisoners, her food was brought to her cell and she was put to work outside the prison walls, in the homes of prison lessees, Captain Ezra Richmond and Judge James Brown. There, she was regularly abused by Brown's wife, to the extent than she attempted to run away but was recaptured and temporarily placed in solitary confinement.

Martha became pregnant while in the Penitentiary. Though the father remains unknown, the list of suspects is limited to those who had access to her while in prison, such as the prison guards and lessees. She gave birth in the fall of 1844 and the child, a daughter named Sarah, remained in her cell with her. With the knowledge that the baby may not survive the winter in a cold cell, 55 people, among them some prominent local figures, signed a petition for Martha's pardon which was granted in December 1844 by Governor John C. Edwards.

== Later life and death ==
After her release, Martha and her children assumed the use of her maiden name and lived with her father, John Curnutt, for some time. Martha's daughter Mary was married to Samuel Nixon, while her son Noah enlisted in the Union Army and died during his service in the Civil War. In her later years, Martha lived with her daughter Mary until her death on April 4, 1887, around the age of 75.

== Legacy ==
Actress Cynthia Nixon is a descendant of Martha Curnutt, via her daughter Mary Nixon who was Cynthia's great-great-grandmother. Cynthia was featured on the celebrity genealogy TV show, Who Do You Think You Are?
