= Inverted pyramid =

Inverted pyramid may refer to:

- Inverted pyramid (journalism), a metaphor in journalism for how information should be prioritized and structured in a text
- Inverted pyramid (management), also known as a "reverse hierarchy", an organizational structure that inverts the classical pyramid of hierarchical organisations
- Inverted pyramid (architecture), a structure in the shape of an upside-down pyramid
  - La Pyramide Inversée, an inverted pyramid structure in the Louvre in Paris, France
- The Inverted Pyramid (novel), by Bertrand Sinclair
- A euphemism for the economic inequality caused by the Dual economy of Cuba, where hospitality workers make more than educated professionals.
