= Baori, Rajasthan =

Baori Lavera Baori, Bawari, Bavari, Bavdi, Bawdi, Baonri
- town
- Location in Rajasthan, India Baori (India)
- Coordinates: 26°37′09″N 73°10′53″E
- Country: India
- State: Rajasthan
- District: Jodhpur
- Tehsil: Bawadi
- Elevation: 260 m (850 ft)

Population (2001)
  - Total: 10,212

Languages
- Time zone: UTC+5:30 (IST)
- PIN: 342037
- ISO 3166 code: RJ-IN
- Vehicle registration: RJ 19

Baori is a panchayat village in the state of Rajasthan, India, Baori is the headquarters town for Bawadi tehsil of Jodhpur District in Rajasthan. Baori is the only village in the gram panchayat.

== Etymology ==
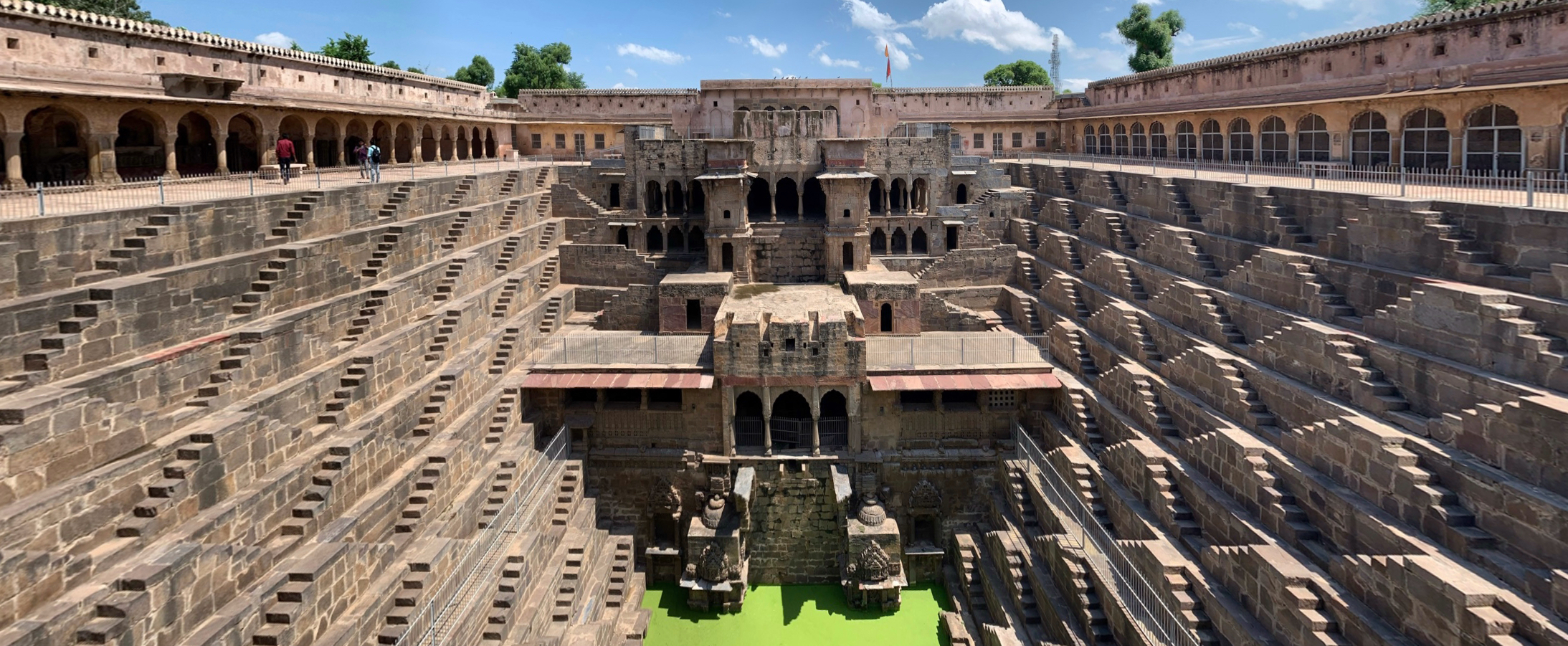
Chand Baori, in the village of Abhaneri near Bandikui, Rajasthan is one of the deepest and largest stepwells in India

The town is named after the step-well there, known as a bawari or baori.

== Geography ==
Baori is located in the Thar Desert at an elevation of 260 metres (853 ft) above mean sea level. The town lies alongside National Highway 62, and is 40 km by road north of the city of Jodhpur

== Demographics ==
In the 2001 census, the town of Baori had 10,212 inhabitants, with 5,419 males (53.1%) and 4,793 females (46.9%), for a gender ratio of 884 females per thousand males.
