= Bawadi tehsil =

- tehsil
- Interactive map of Bawadi tehsil
- Location in Rajasthan, India Bawadi tehsil (India)
- Coordinates: 26°36′N 073°17′E
- Country: India
- State: Rajasthan
- District: Jodhpur
- Time zone: UTC+5:30 (IST)
- ISO 3166 code: RJ-IN
- Vehicle registration: RJ-
- Lok Sabha constituency: Pali
- Vidhan Sabha constituency: Bhopalgarh

Bawadi tehsil is a tehsil in Jodhpur District of Rajasthan state in western India. The tehsil headquarters are in Baori.

== Geography ==
Bawadi tehsil is one of the eleven tehsils in Jodhpur District. It borders Nagaur District to the north, Bhopalgarh tehsil to the east, Mandor tehsil to the south, and Osian tehsil to the west.

A rare tree elsewhere, the dhauro (Anogeissus sericea var. nummularia), a small brown-barked tree with drooping branches and yellow flowers which has a winged fruit in the spring, has a fine stand of healthy trees in Bawadi Taluk.

== History ==
In 2009 Bawadi tehsil was created out of the western portion of Bhopalgarh tehsil.

== Villages ==
There are twenty-six panchayat villages in Bawadi tehsil.
