= Gasti =

Gasti گستي
- Village
- Interactive map of Gasti
- Coordinates: 31°20′38″N 50°07′35″E
- Country: Iran
- Province: Khuzestan
- County: Bagh-e Malek
- Bakhsh: Seydun
- Rural District: Seydun-e Jonubi

Population (2006)
  - Total: 313
- Time zone: UTC+3:30 (IRST)
  - Summer (DST): UTC+4:30 (IRDT)

Gasti (Persian: گستي, also Romanized as Gastī) is a village in Seydun-e Jonubi Rural District, Seydun District, Bagh-e Malek County, Khuzestan Province, Iran. At the 2006 census, its population was 313, in 62 families.
