= Modhera =

Village in Gujarat, India

Coordinates: 23°35′N 72°08′E

Modhera is a village in Becharaji Taluka in Mehsana district, Gujarat, India. The town is well known for the Sun Temple of Chaulukya era. The town is located on the bank of Pushpavati river.

== History ==
The town was known as Dharmaranya during Puranic age. It is believed that Rama had performed yagna here to cleanse the sin of killing Brahmin Ravana. He had built Modherak which was later known as Modhera.

The Sun Temple was built during the reign of Bhima I of Chaulukya dynasty in 1026-1027 (Vikram Samvat 1083). Modheshwari Temple is located in the village. Gyaneshwari/Dharmeshwari stepwell belongs to 16th-17th centuries. It has a shrine at the first pavilion of the stepwell instead of usual at the end. The stepwell of Modhera probably belongs to the 11th century with the mandapa belonging to 10th century. Hawa Mahal is a building located on an elevated location. It is a sandstone pavilion with six pilasters and 12 pillars supporting a flat roof. Some pillars have kichaka brackets on their top. There is a jali window on its rear side and an ornamental geometric patterns on the edge of its plinth. It was erected from the ruined parts of the earlier structure from the Chaulukya era.

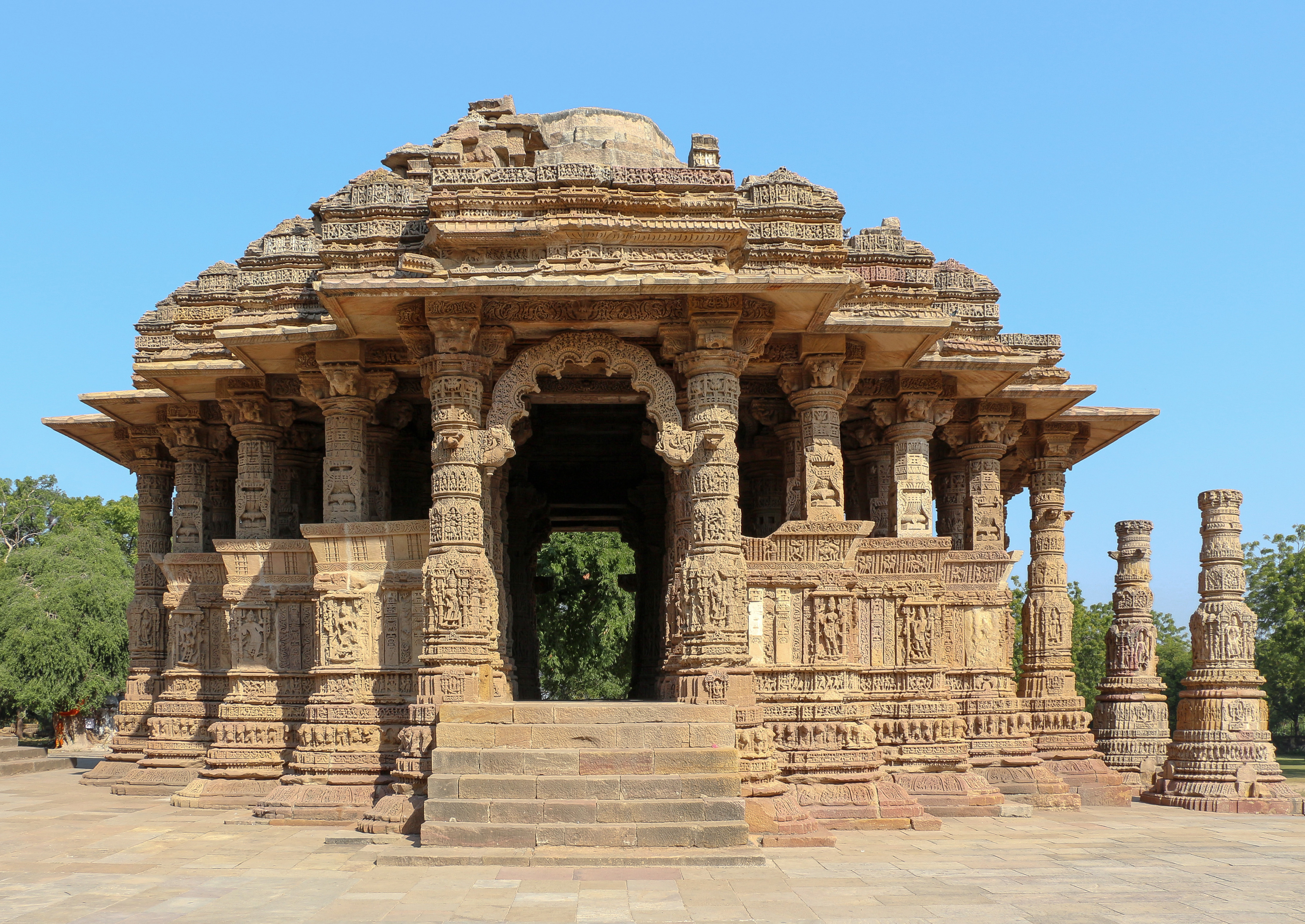
Sun Temple, Modhera

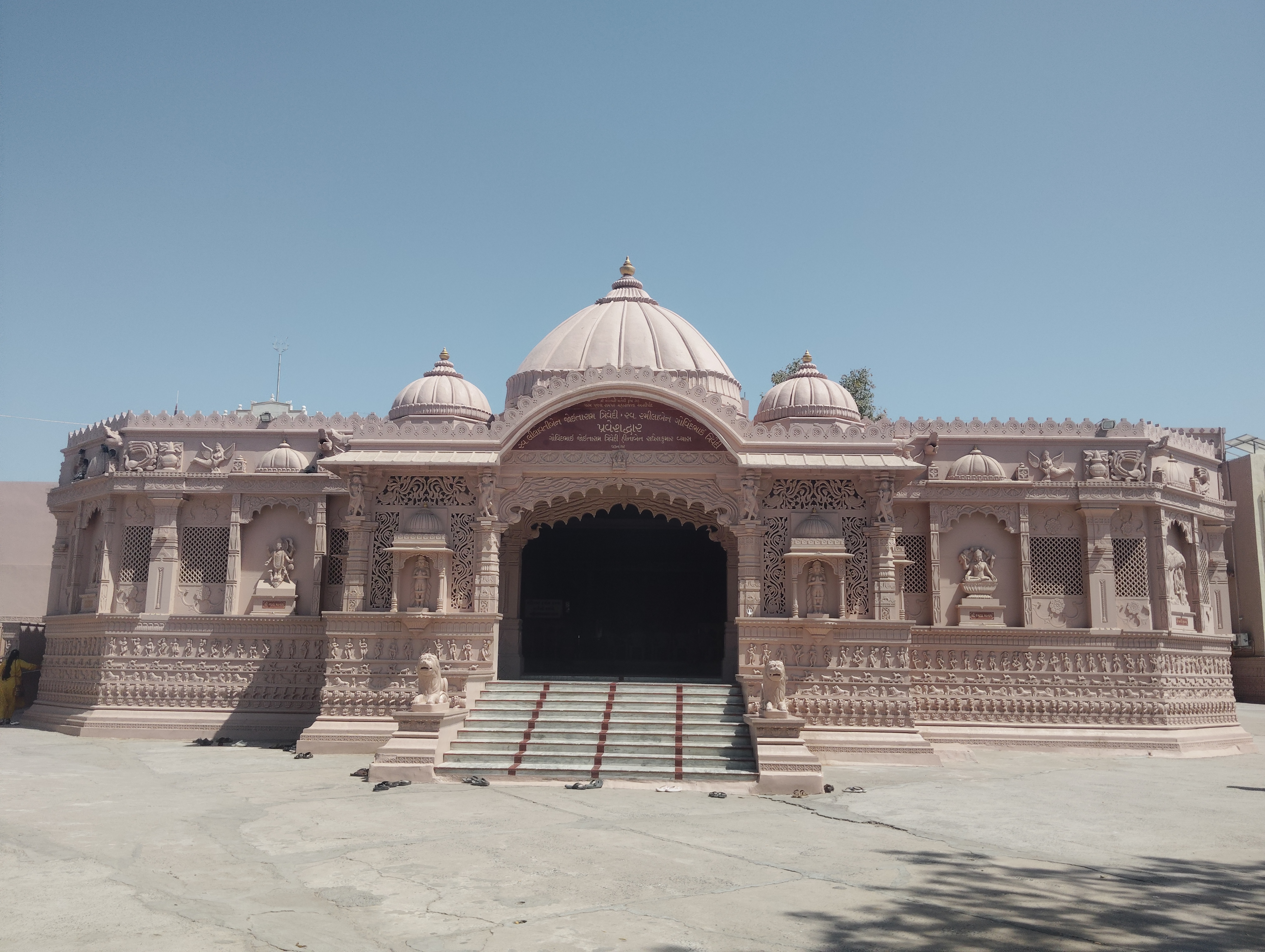
Modheshwari Temple

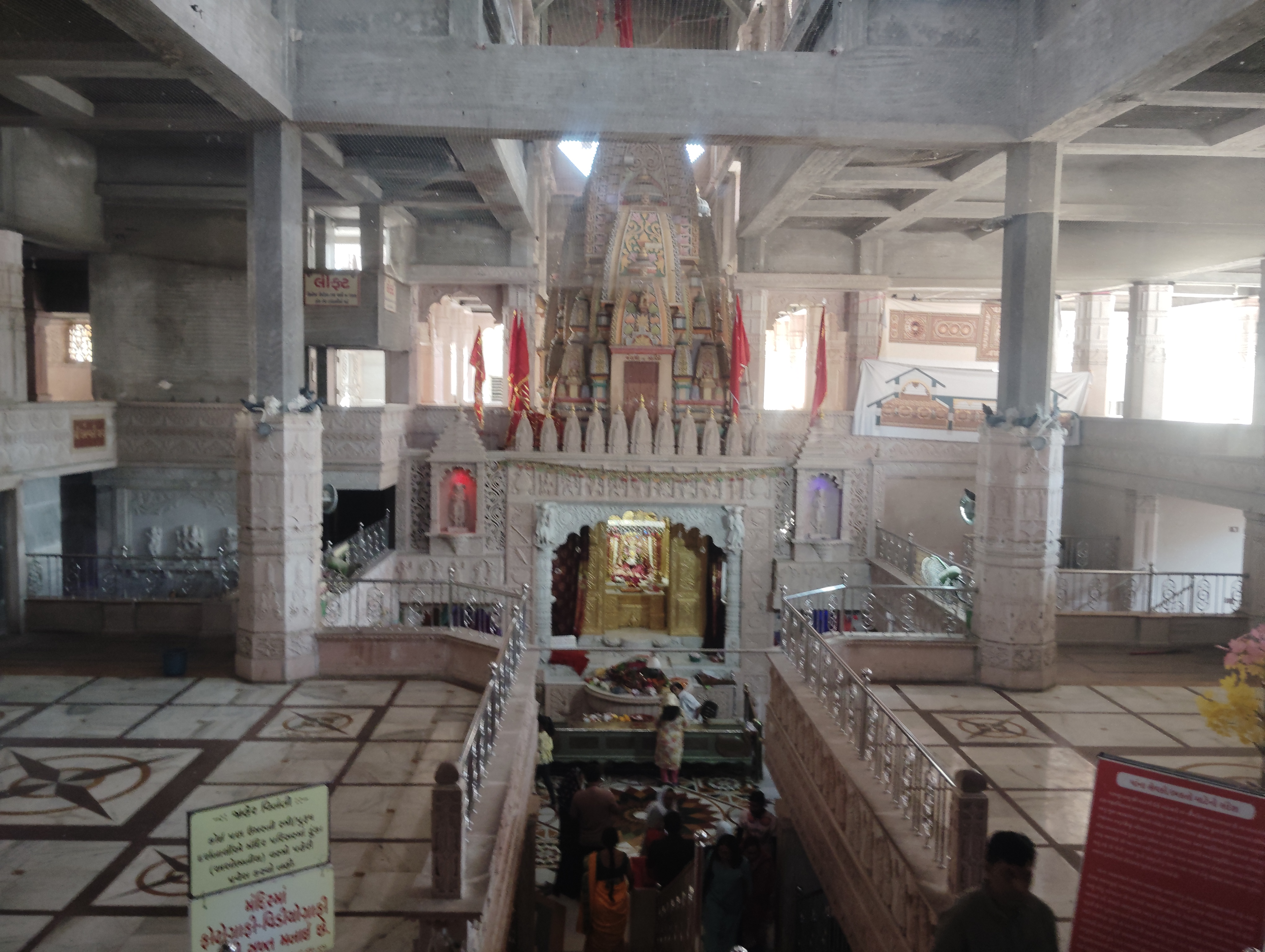
Modheshwari temple from inside

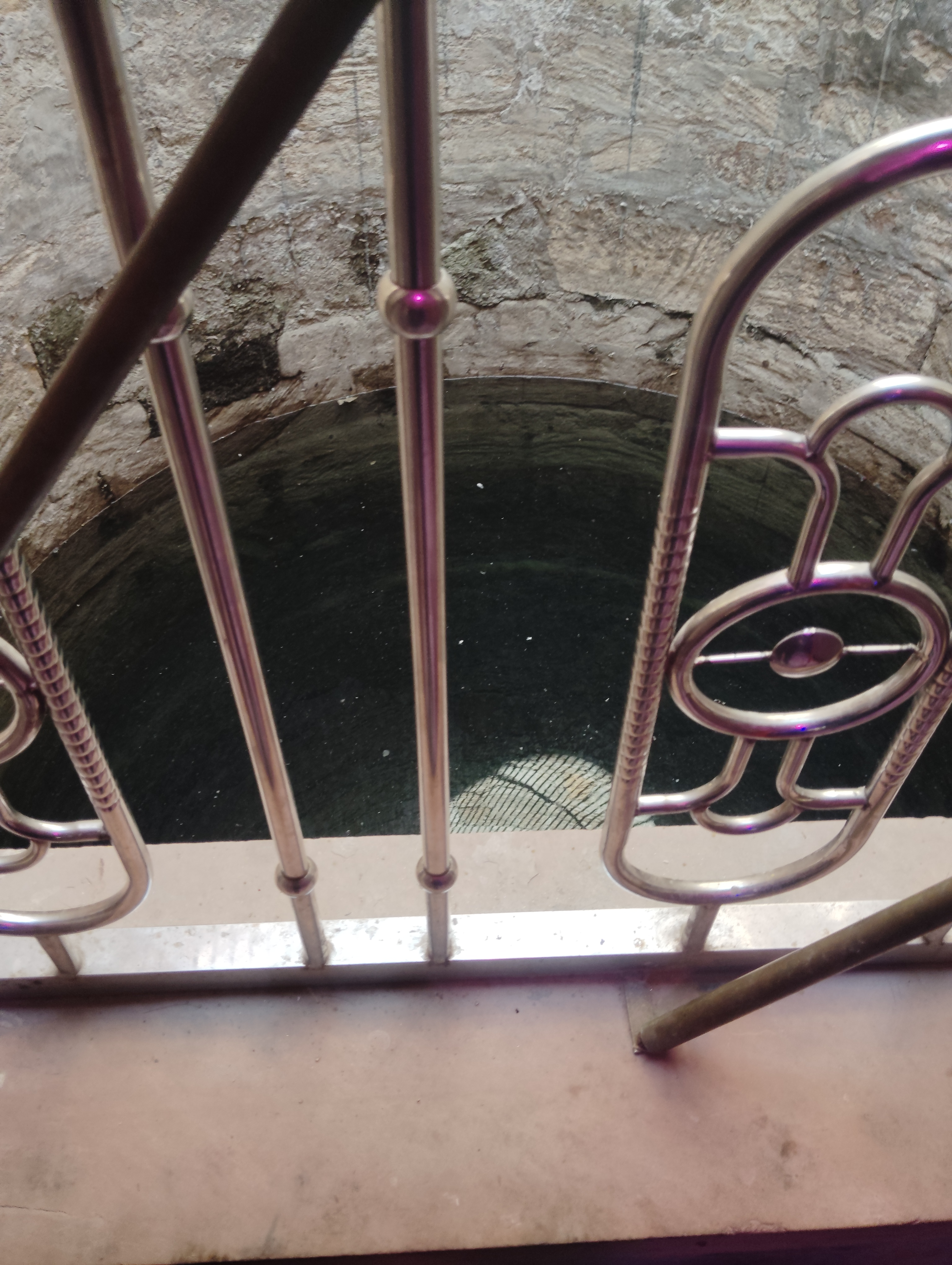
Dharmeshwari Vav

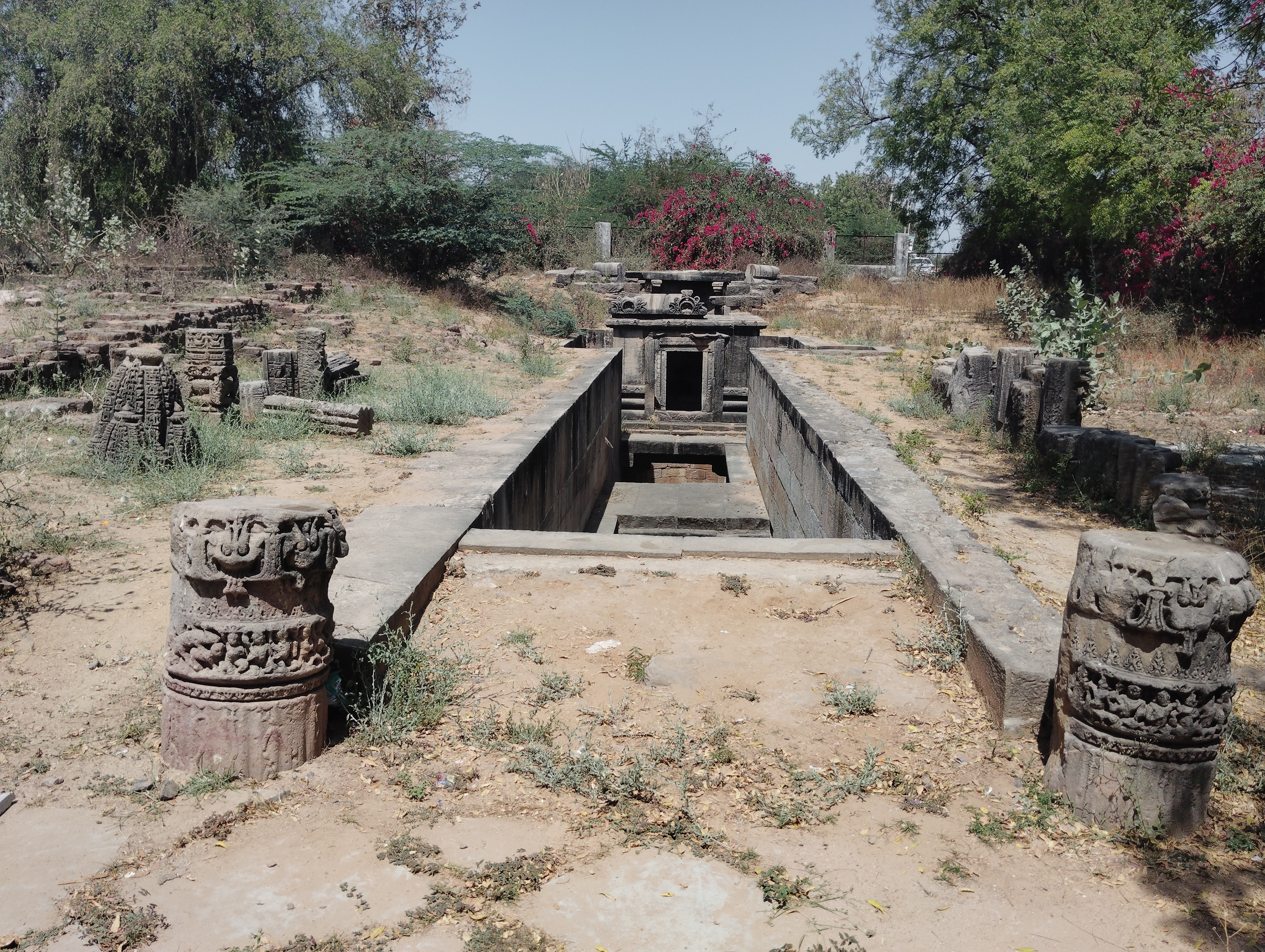
Modhera Vav

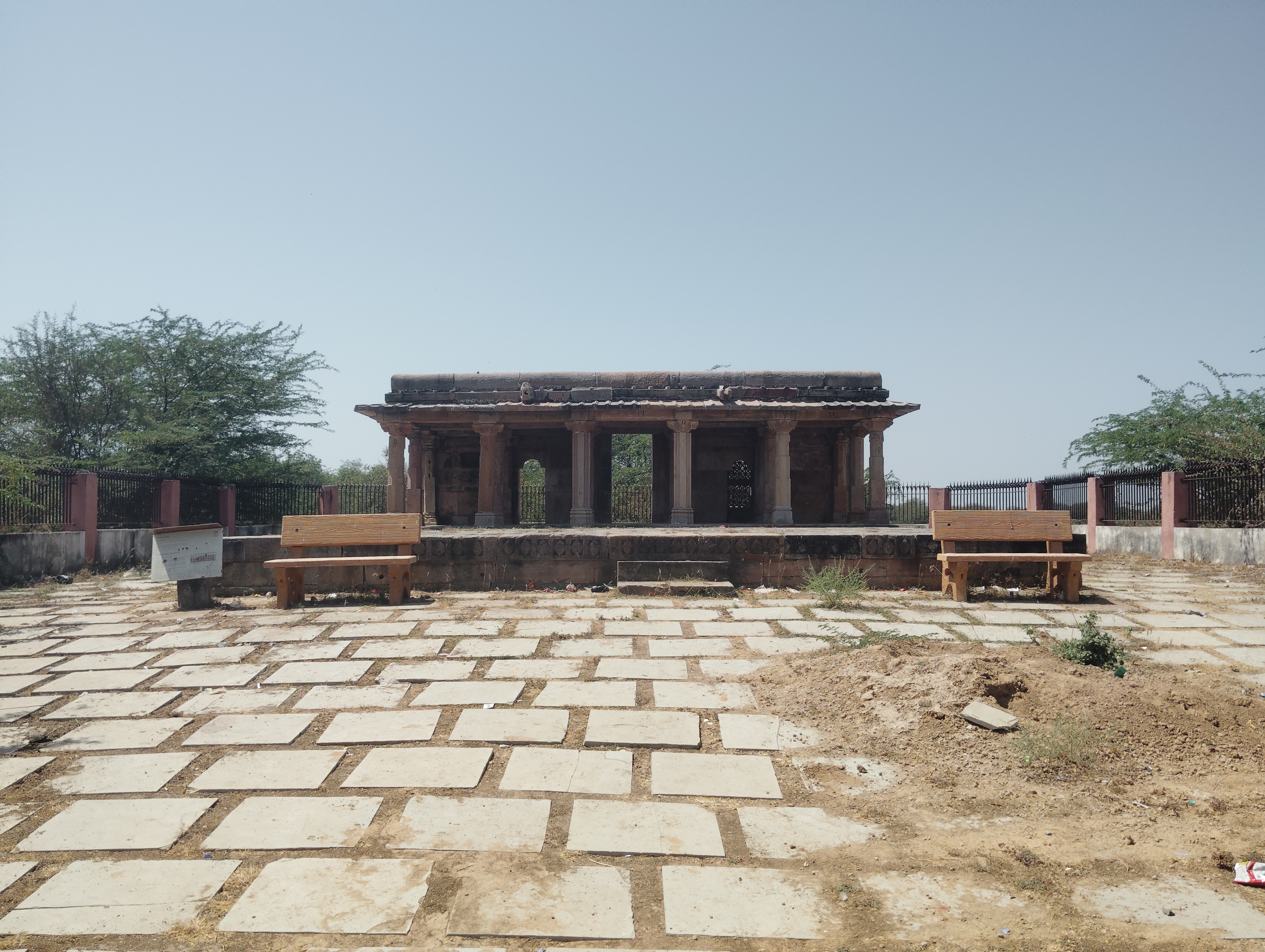
Hawa Mahal

== Economy ==
=== Electricity ===
Modhera is the first "solar village" of India. The village meets its complete electricity requirements by a 6 MW solar plant with a 15 MWh battery energy storage system on 12 hectares (0.12 km^{2}) land located 3 kilometres (1.9 miles) from the village. A total of 1300 out of the 1600 houses in the village installed rooftop solar systems. The project cost ₹65 crore (equivalent to ₹73 crore or US$7.6 million in 2023) with half financed by the Government of Gujarat and the other half by the Government of India.

== See also ==
- Modh
