= Sun Temple, Modhera =

Surya Temple in Gujarat, India

Modhera Sun Temple
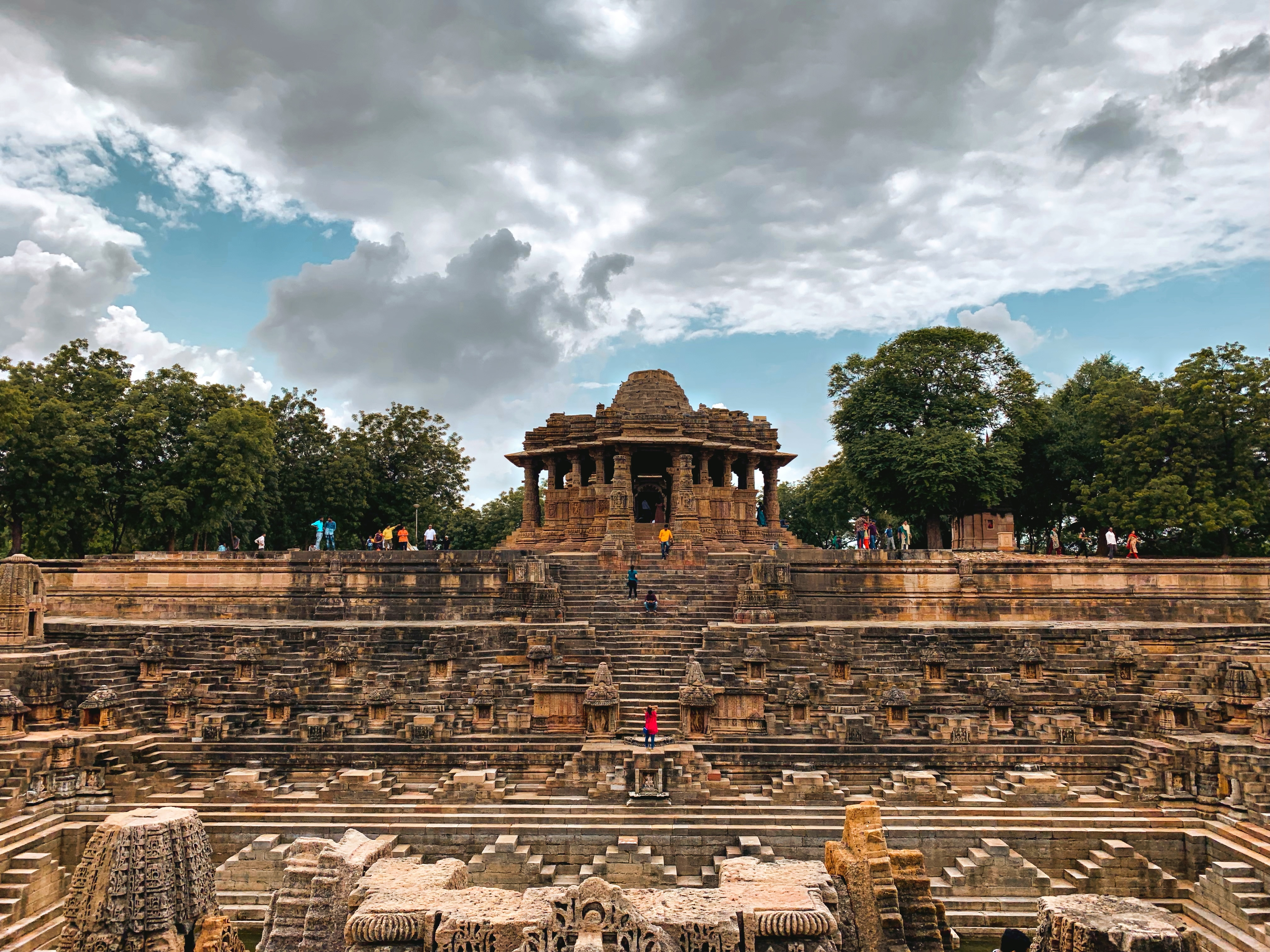
- The temple complex

- Location in Gujarat
- Alternative names: Modhera Surya Mandir

General information
- Location: Modhera, Mehsana district, Gujarat, India
- Coordinates: 23°35′1.7″N 72°7′57.67″E

Technical details
- Material: Sandstone

Design and construction
- Designations: ASI Monument of National Importance (N-GJ-158)
Sun Temple, Modhera
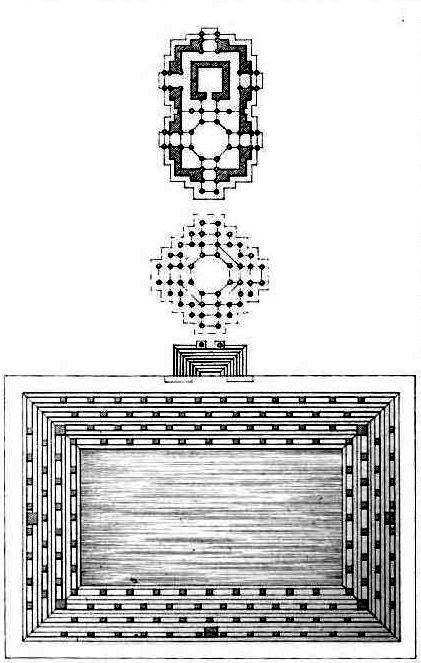
- Plan of temple complex: (from top to bottom) Gudhamandapa, the shrine hall; Sabhamandapa, the assembly hall and Kunda, the reservoir
Religion
- Affiliation: Hinduism
- Deity: Surya
- Festival: Modhera Dance Festival
- Features: Tower: Ruined; Temple tank: Suryakund
Location
- Interactive map of Sun Temple, Modhera
Architecture
- Type: Māru-Gurjara architecture (Chaulukya)
- Creator: Bhima I
- Completed: after 1026-27 CE (shrine proper)
Specifications
- Direction of façade: East-facing
- Monument: 3
- Inscriptions: Yes

The Sun Temple of Modhera is a Hindu temple dedicated to the solar deity Surya, located in the village of Modhera in Mehsana district, Gujarat, India. The temple is situated on the bank of the river Pushpavati, and was constructed in the 11th century during the reign of Bhima I and Karna I of the Chaulukya dynasty. The temple is no longer used for worship and is a protected monument maintained by the Archaeological Survey of India. The temple complex has three components: Gūḍhamanḍapa, the shrine hall; Sabhamanḍapa, the assembly hall and Kunḍa, the reservoir. The halls are noted for the intricately carved exteriors and decorated pillars. The tiered steps of the reservoir lead to the bottom and numerous small shrines.

== History ==
The shrine proper of the Sun Temple was built during the reign of Bhima I of Chaulukya dynasty. (Note: The decoration of Torana and columns resembles that of Vimala Vasahi Adinath temple of Dilwara Temples built in 1031-32 which confirms its period.) Earlier, during 1024–1025, Mahmud of Ghazni had invaded Bhima's kingdom, and a force of around 20,000 soldiers had unsuccessfully tried to check his advance at Modhera. Historian A. K. Majumdar theorizes that the Sun Temple might have been built to commemorate this defense. On a block in the western wall of the cella, there is an upside-down inscription "Vikram Samvat 1083" carelessly incised in Devnagari script which corresponds to 1026–1027 CE. No other date is found. As the inscription is upside down, it evidences the destruction and reconstruction of the cella. Due to the position of the inscription, it is not firmly considered as the date of construction. On stylistic grounds, it is known that the Kunda with its corner shrines was built earlier at the beginning of the 11th century. The inscription is considered as the date of destruction by Ghazni instead of the construction. Soon after Bhima had returned to power, the temple proper, the miniature and the niche shrines in the tank were built shortly after 1026 CE. The dancing hall was added later, in the third quarter of the 11th century along with the gateways, the porch of the temple proper and the doorframes of the temple and the cella; during the reign of the Karna.

The temple is built on 23.6° latitude (approximately near Tropic of Cancer). (Note: The Tropic of Cancer position is not fixed, but varies in a complicated manner over time. It drifts south almost half an arcsecond (0.47″) of latitude per year (it was at exactly 23° 27′ in year 1917 and will be at 23° 26' in 2045). See axial tilt and circles of latitude for further information.) The place was later known as Sita ni Chauri and Ramkund locally. (Note: In 1887, Alexander Kinloch Forbes described in his book Rasmala that the place was known by locals as Sita ni Chauri and Ramkund associated with Rama and Sita of Ramayana.) No worship is offered here now. The temple is the Monument of National Importance and is maintained by the Archeological Survey of India.

It was added to the tentative list of the UNESCO World Heritage Committee in December 2022.

== Architecture ==
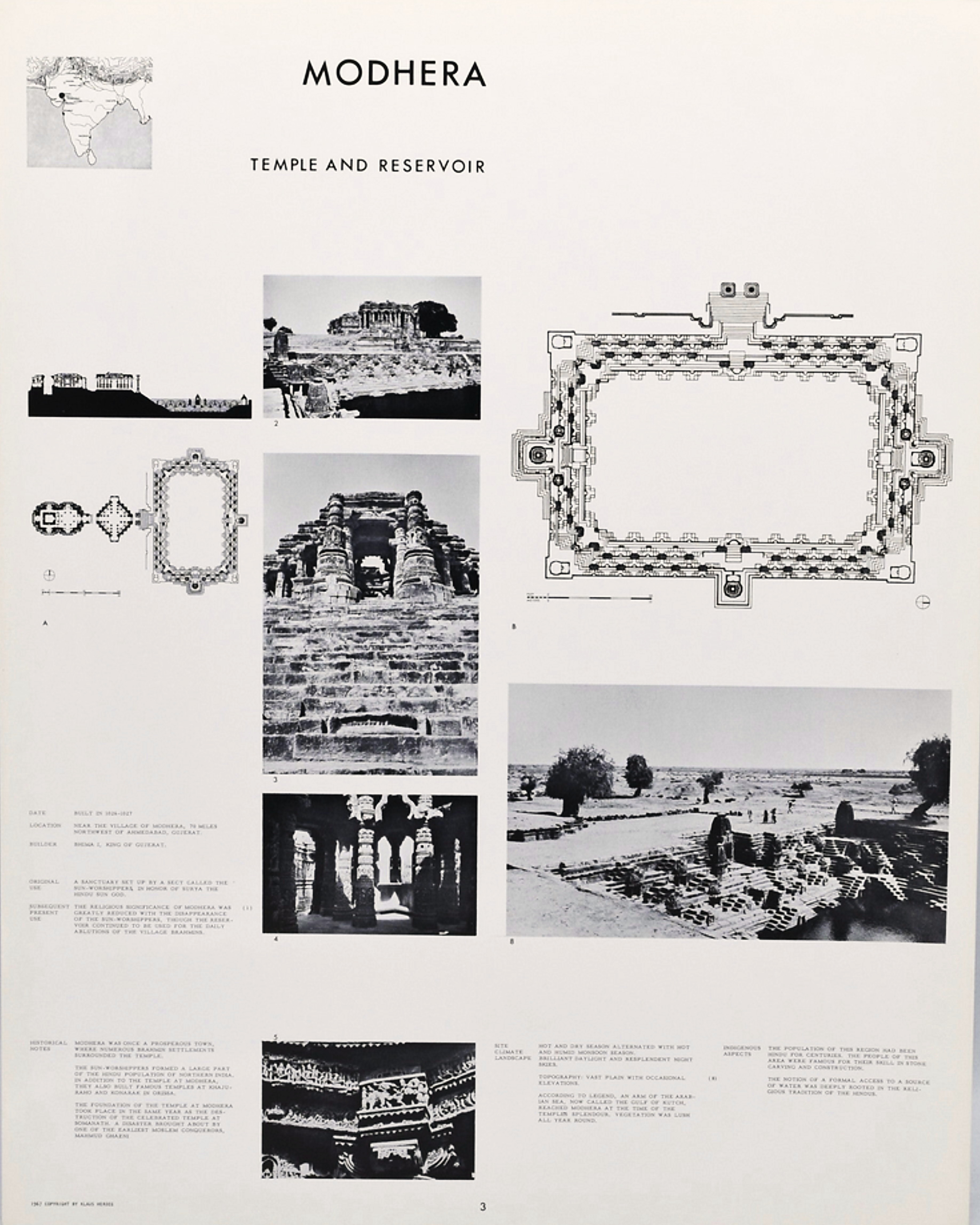
"Formal Structure in Indian Architcture", Klaus Herdeg (1967)

The temple complex is constructed in the Māru-Gurjara architectural style, also known as the Chaulukya style. It comprises three axially aligned components: the sanctum (garbhagriha) enclosed within a hall (guḍhamaṇḍapa), an outer assembly hall (sabhamaṇḍapa or raṅgamaṇḍapa), and a sacred stepped reservoir (kuṇḍa).

The Sabhamandapa is not in continuation with Gudhamandapa but is placed little away as a separate structure. Both are built on a paved platform. Their roofs collapsed long ago leaving behind a few lower-most courses. Both roofs are 15' 9" in diameter but are constructed differently.

=== Gudhamandapa and Garbhagriha ===
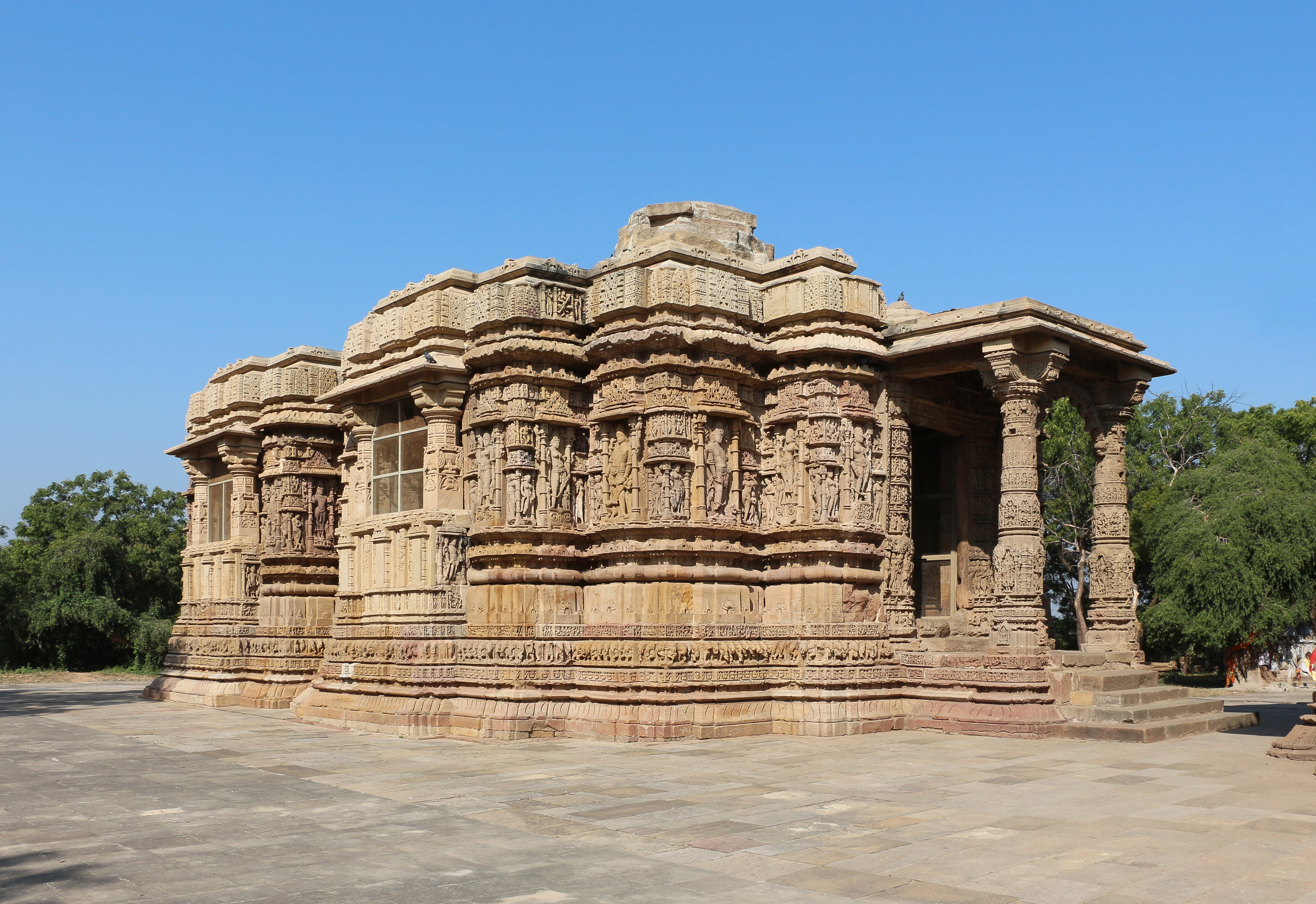
Gudhamandapa

The gudhamandapa measures approximately 51 feet 9 inches by 25 feet 8 inches and is nearly equally divided between the gudhamandapa (the closed hall) and the garbhagriha (the sanctum or shrine proper). Both sections are rectangular in plan, featuring a single projection on each of the shorter sides and two projections on each of the longer sides. The projections on the shorter sides form the entrance and the rear of the shrine.

Each of the three projections on the outer walls of the gudhamanḍapa originally contained a window, while the eastern projection featured the main doorway. These windows were fitted with intricately carved perforated stone screens, known as jalis; the northern window survives in a ruined condition, and the southern one is missing. A pradaksinapatha (circumambulatory passage) is formed between the walls of the garbhagrha and the outer walls of the gudhamandapa. The roof of this passage is supported by stone slabs carved with rosette motifs. The original shikhara (superstructure) above the sanctum no longer exists.

==== Garbhagriha ====
The Garbhagriha (or sanctum sanctorum) is a square structure with interior dimensions measuring approximately 11 feet on each side. It serves as the central shrine of the temple.

The Garbhagriha contains two distinct cells: an upper and a lower cell. The floor of the upper cell has collapsed, and it is believed that this area once housed the image of a deity. The seat of the image is now located in a pit beneath the collapsed floor. The lower cell is thought to have been used for storage purposes.

Internally, the walls of the shrine are plain, while the outer wall is ornately decorated. The doorway is adorned with carved figures of a seated Surya (Sun God), Ganesha and Kubera accompanied by dancers and amorous couples in the surrounding panels. However, these figures have suffered significant damage, and the images on the door-lintel are completely destroyed. (Note: It may have had Ganesha as in other Surya or Vishnu temples.)

Architecturally, the Garbhagriha is aligned in such a way that the first rays of the rising sun illuminate the image of Surya during the solar equinoxes. On the summer solstice, the sun shines directly above the temple at noon, casting no shadow.

==== Gudhamandapa ====
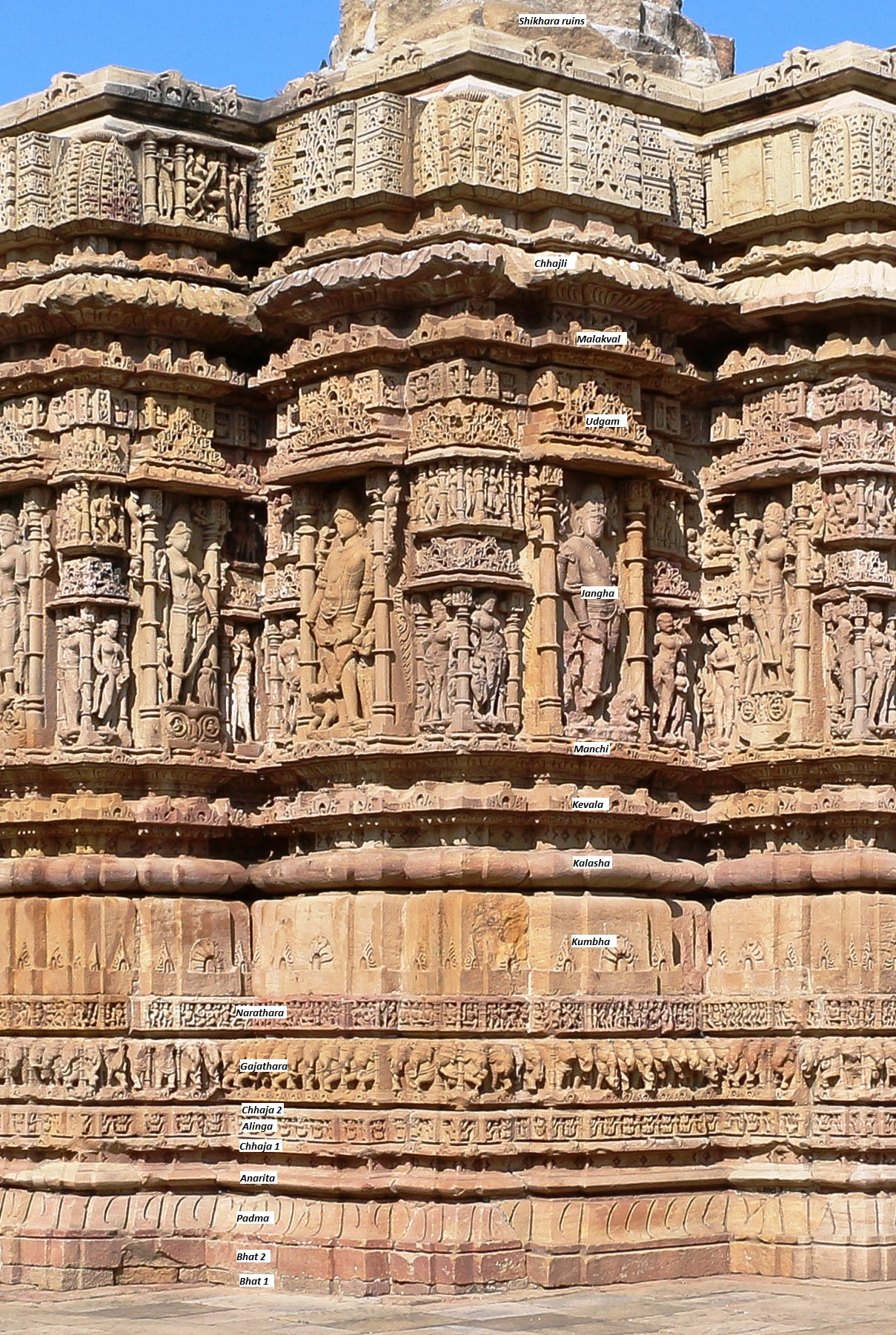
Gudhamandapa with annotation of exterior moldings (click to enlarge)

Base moldings

The outer walls of the shrine are ornately decorated. The base and walls of both the shrine and the hall are divided into several horizontal sections, each featuring unique carvings. The base, or pitha (also known as adhisthana), begins with two square moldings called bhat, followed by a cyma recta carving—convex at the bottom and concave at the top. It is followed by padma or padmaka, the molding shaped like an inverted lotus.

Above this is the antarita, a fillet or astragal with a sharp edge between two recessed sections. This is followed by patta, which features a thin molding called chhaja at its lower edge. The next is another chhaja separated by neck, alinga. The broad band that follows, known as patti, is the gajathara, which is carved with elephants. The subsequent band, narathara, contains figures of humans in various postures.

Mandovara or wall moldings

In the mandovara (the exterior wall molding of the temple), the decorative elements begin with the kumbha, a pitcher-shaped base. This section features a broad, undecorated band at the bottom, while its middle portion is adorned with oval discs. Above the kumbha is the kalasha, another pitcher-shaped molding. This is followed by a wide band containing chaitya windows, known as kevala, which is succeeded by a similar band called manchi. These two bands are separated by a deep recessed strip. Above the thin fillet, the main paneled section of the wall, known as the jangha, is located. The panels are adorned with depictions of various gods, with the figures of Surya prominently featured, reflecting the temple's dedication to him. Other panels are decorated with dancers and other figures.

The figure of Surya is prominently carved in three niches of the shrine proper, as well as on each side of three windows in the outer wall of the Gudhamandapa. In these depictions, Surya is shown standing, with two arms holding lotuses and being driven by seven horses. It has some Persian influences. The walls feature 12 niches, each depicting a different aspect of Surya corresponding to each month. Other figures along with Vishwakarma, Ganesha, and Saraswati include the eight Dikpals - Indra, Varuna, Agni, Yama, Nirrti, Kubera, Vayu and Ishan.

Each figure in the panel is topped with a small cornice, above which sits a triangular pediment containing a chaitya-window, known as an udgam. The next projecting band, featuring a chaitya-window and a kirtimukha, is referred to as the malakva. The uppermost feature is the main cornice, called the chhajli.

This was followed by shikhara which no longer exists. The Vimana featured horizontal geometrical and figurative bands that rose to form a shikhara resembling Mount Meru. The central spire included several miniature shrines called Urushringa, whose form is inferred by the shrines located on the steps of the Kunda.

Mandapa

The mandapa, a hall was roofed with a dome that likely rose in a concentric pattern. It is supported by eight principal pillars arranged in an octagonal layout: four positioned in front of the shrine proper, and two each in the recesses of windows and doorway. The pillars have an octagonal base that transitions into a circular form as they rise.

=== Sabhamandapa ===
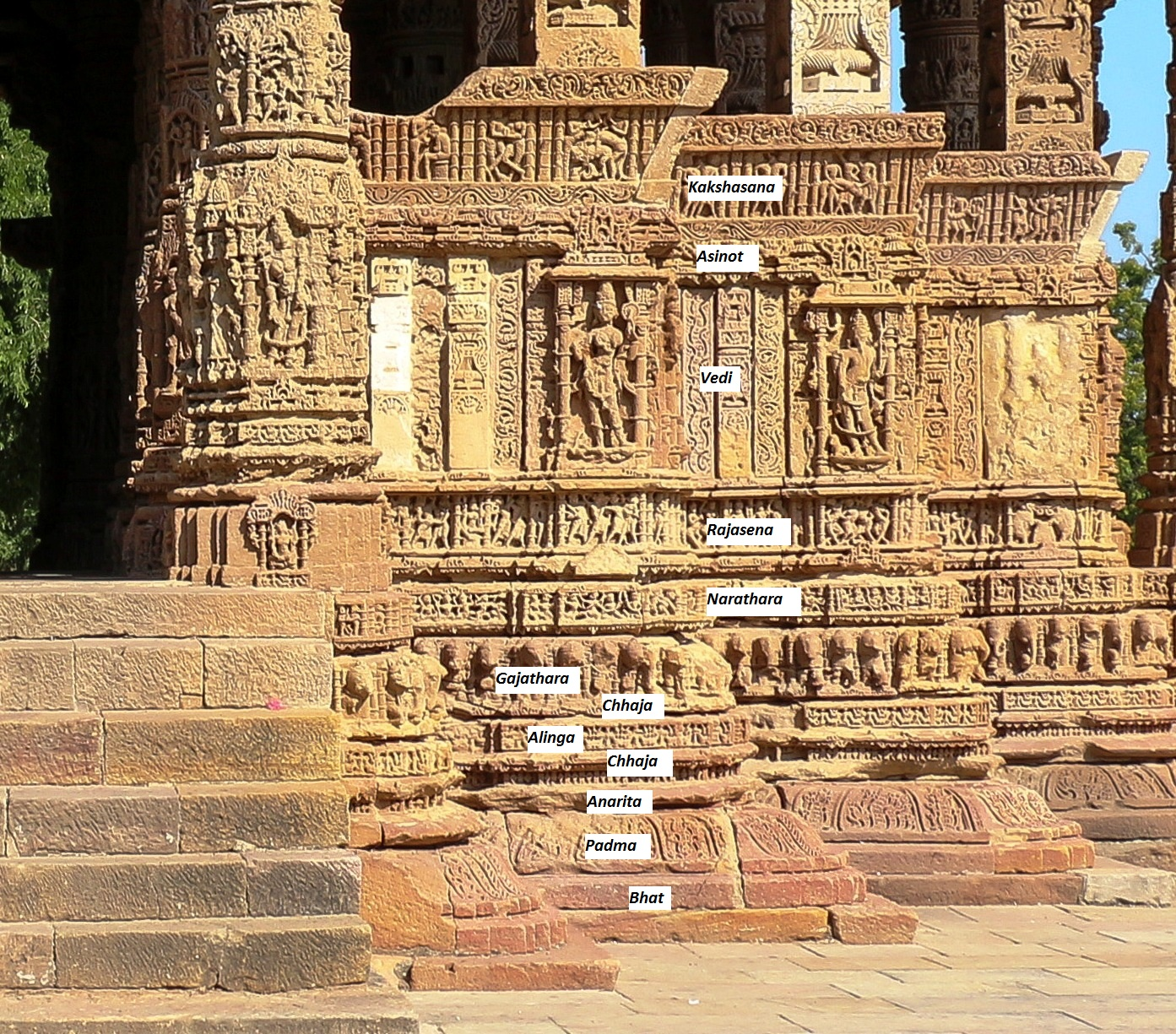
Sabhamandapa with annotation of exterior mouldings (click to enlarge)

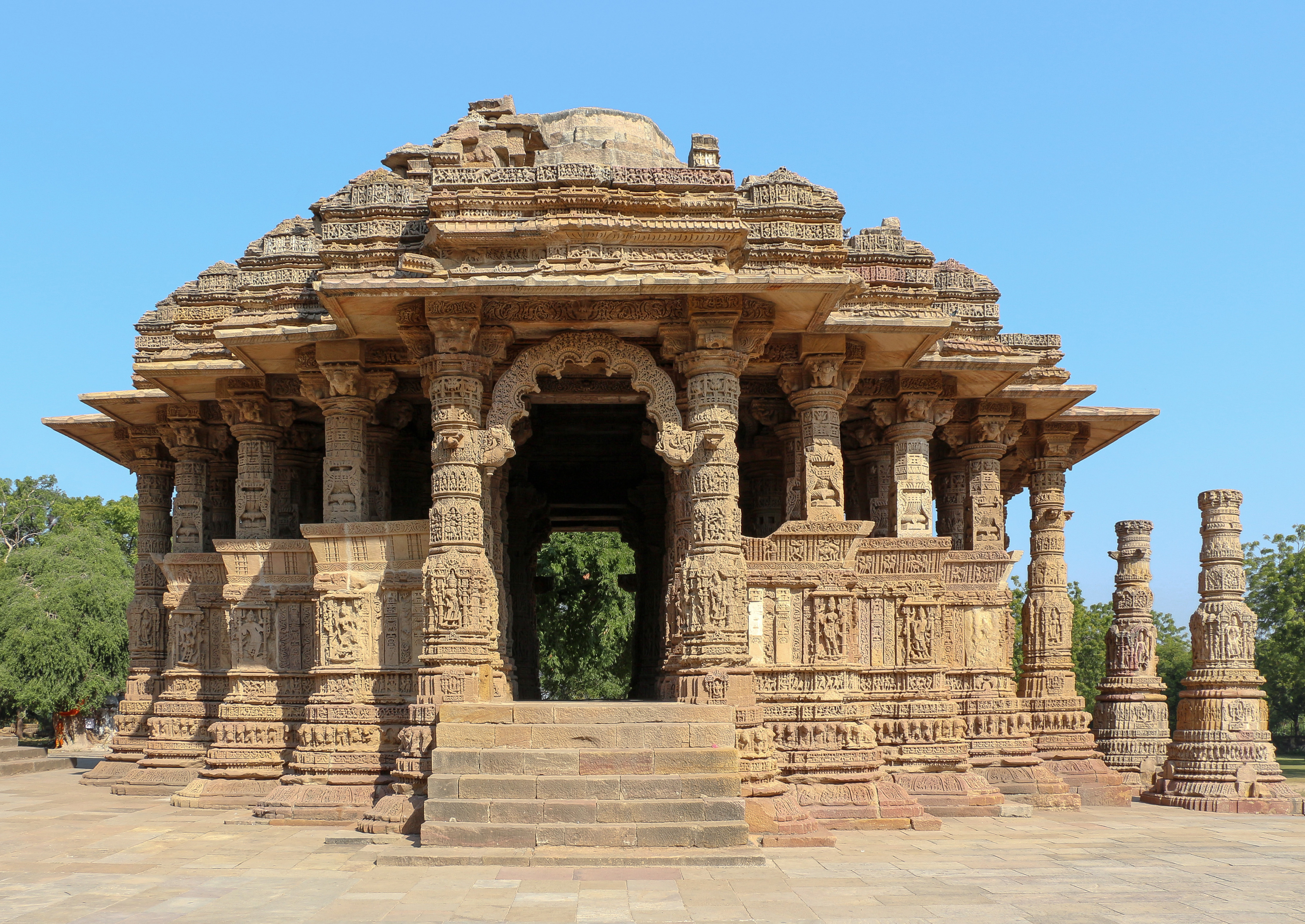
Sabhamandapa with ornately carved pillars and exterior

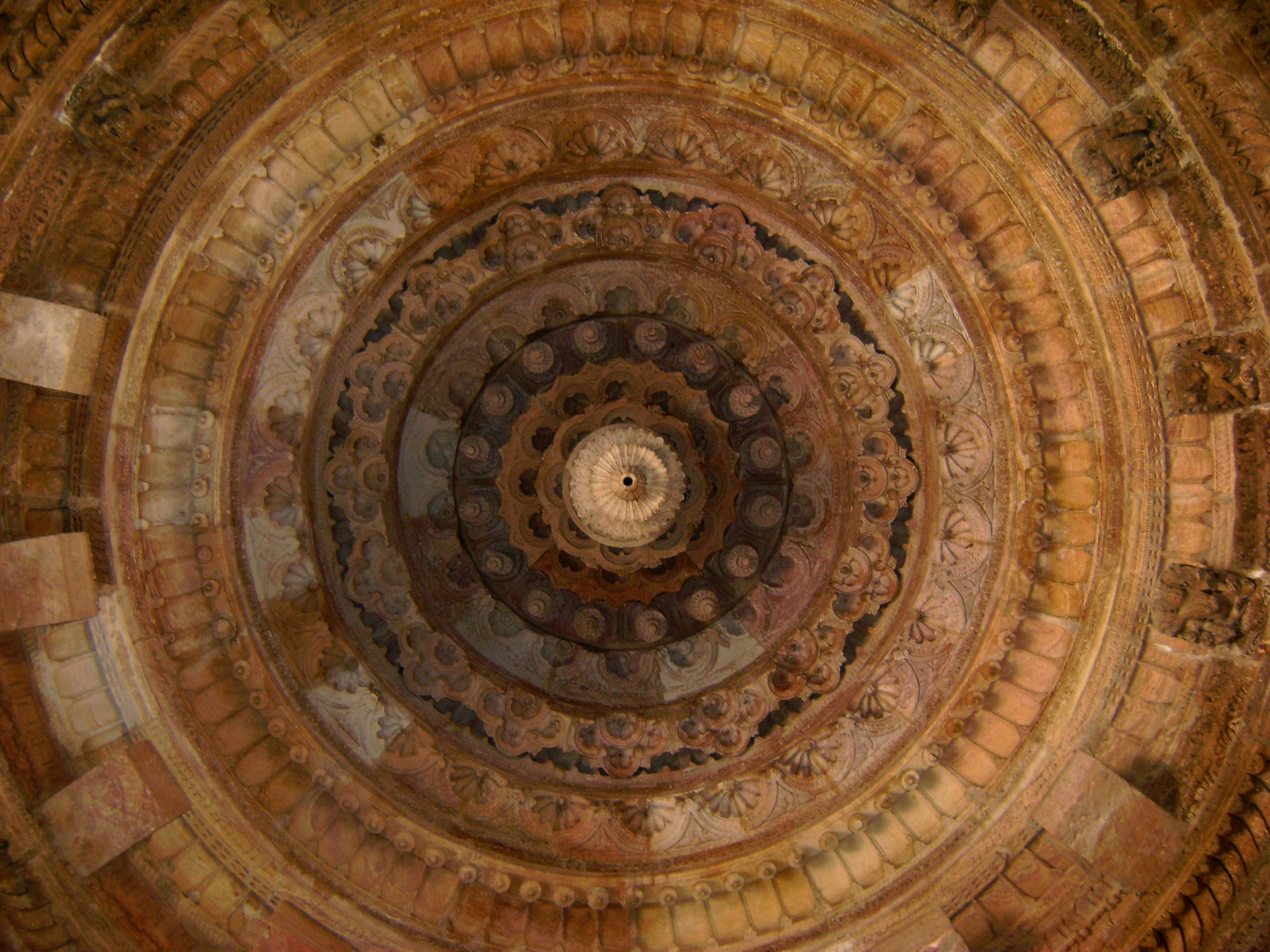
ceiling of Sabhamandapa

The sabhamandapa, or rangamandapa—the assembly hall or dancing hall—is parallelogram-shaped in plan, with rows of pillars and diagonal entrances on each side. Its extensively carved exterior features a series of recessed corners, creating an impression of the star-shaped layout. There are 52 intricately carved pillars. Madhusudan Dhaky has suggested that the sabhamandapa may have been later addition based on style and construction.

Base moldings

The pitha is similar to the Gudhamandapa, but smaller in size, as two courses of fillets are omitted. The padma is richly carved with floral ornamentation.

Wall moldings

Above the Narathara, a band of figures depicting dancers and gods, known as rajasena, is present. The next tier is vedi that corresponds to the jangha of the mandovara and is decorated with large panels of gods, goddesses, and floral designs. This is followed by a cornice called asinot. Next is the kakshasana, which slopes outwards to form the backrests of the asana, a bench that runs around the hall. This section features erotic figures interspersed with rail patterns.

Ceiling and torana

The roof, which was shaped like a stepped pyramid, no longer exists but the outline of the steps is visible in its profile. Inside, the ceiling rises in tiers, forming a walnut-like shape, and features numerous floral garlands. The ceiling is 23 feet high. It is supported by pillars arranged in an octagonal plan. These pillars have stilts that support the lintels. Torana, or the decorated cusped arches, spring from the lower brackets of the pillars and meet the lintels at their midpoint. There are two types of arches: semicircular and triangular. The semicircular arches feature cusped arches with tips, while triangular arches have a round apex and wavy sides. Both types include a broad band decorated with figures and ornamental tips, many of which are now defaced and damaged. The lower brackets feature makara which gives the structure its name Makara-Torana while the decorative elements give it name of chitra-torana.

=== Pillars ===
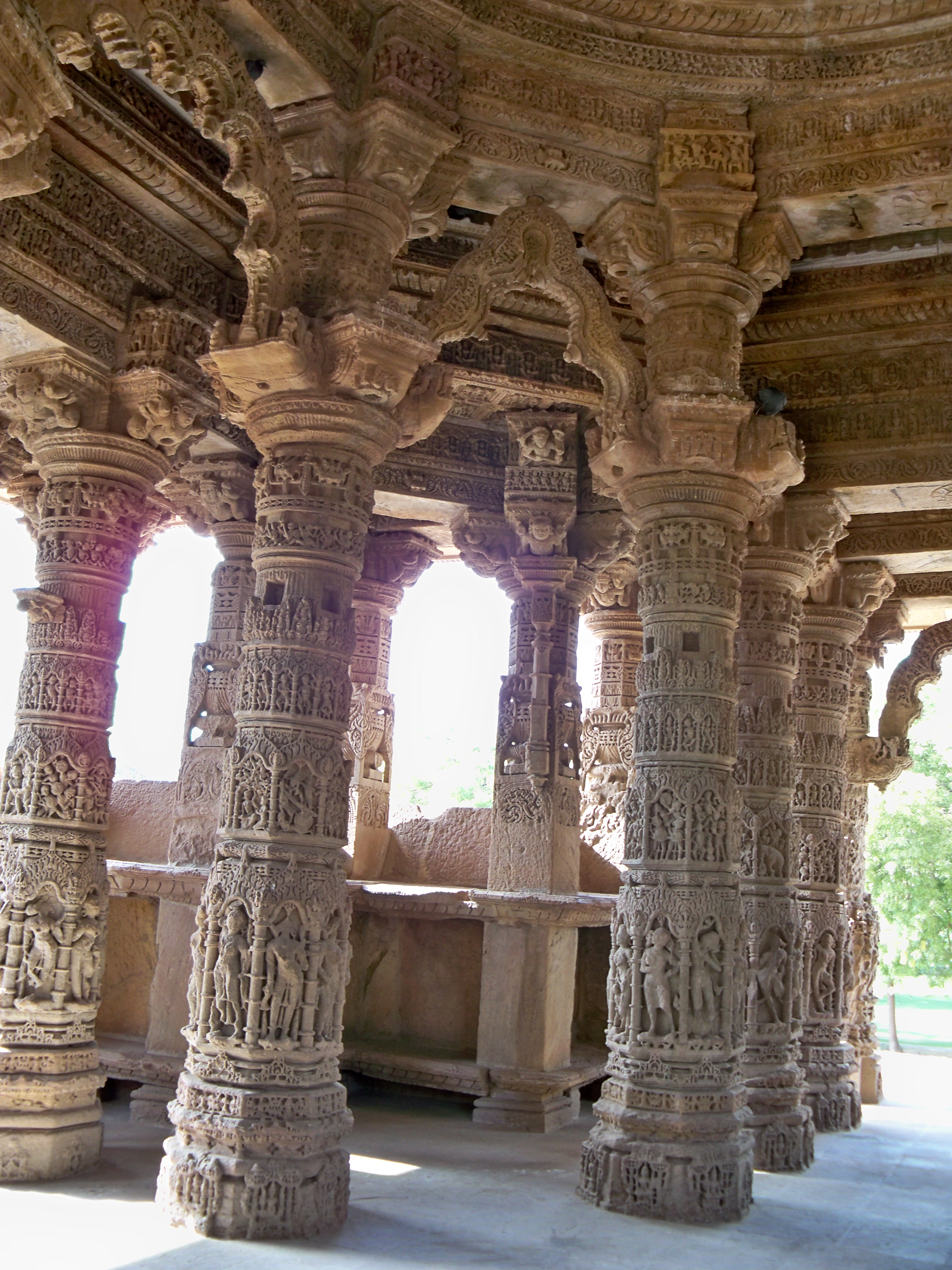
Long and short pillars, semicircular and triangular arches

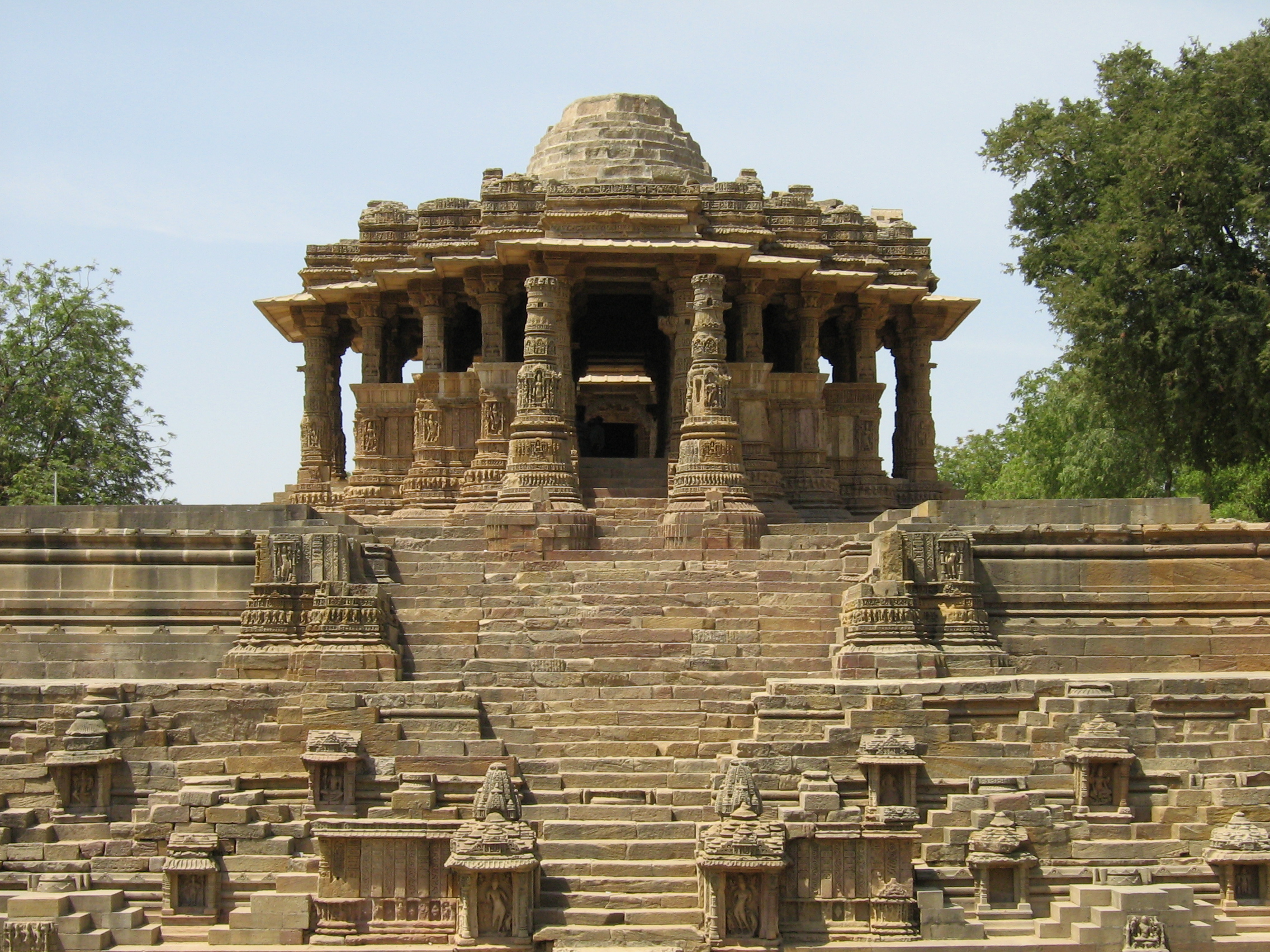
Pillars of Kirti-Torana and steps leading to Kunda

The pillars of the Sabhamandapa and Gudhamandapa are generally categorized into two types: short and tall. The shorter pillars that rest on the walls and support the roof, and the taller pillars that rise directly from the floor.

Short pillars

The pillar shaft is square in cross-section up to approximately half of its height, after which it transitions into a vase-shaped element and then into an octagonal section. It is topped with a capital and a bracket. Each face of the square section features a circular floral motif, while the corners of the vase-shaped portion are similarly decorated. The octagonal section is divided into four bands, with the uppermost band containing a depiction of kirtimukha. The capital comprises three annulets.

Tall pillars

The pillar rises from a square or octagonal base known as the kumbhi, which features triangular ornamentation on each face. Above this is the kalasha, followed by a deep horizontal band. Next is the kevala, adorned with miniature chaitya-window motifs. This is succeeded by a kirtimukha, and then by a triangular pediment also decorated with chaitya-windows.

The shaft begins with a decorative band featuring standing figures—primarily dancers—positioned on all eight faces and framed within ringed pilasters. Above this is a horizontal band depicting scenes of humans and animals, separated from the lower section by a rounded, cushion-like molding. This is followed by a narrower band containing sixteen standing human figures, each separated by small annulets below. Above this is a band adorned with stylized leaf motifs. The shaft then transitions into a circular form, featuring three or four horizontal bands that include rows of male warriors, lozenges, circles, and, finally, a depiction of kirtimukha. These kirtimukha figures are separated by ornamental motifs of chains and bells.

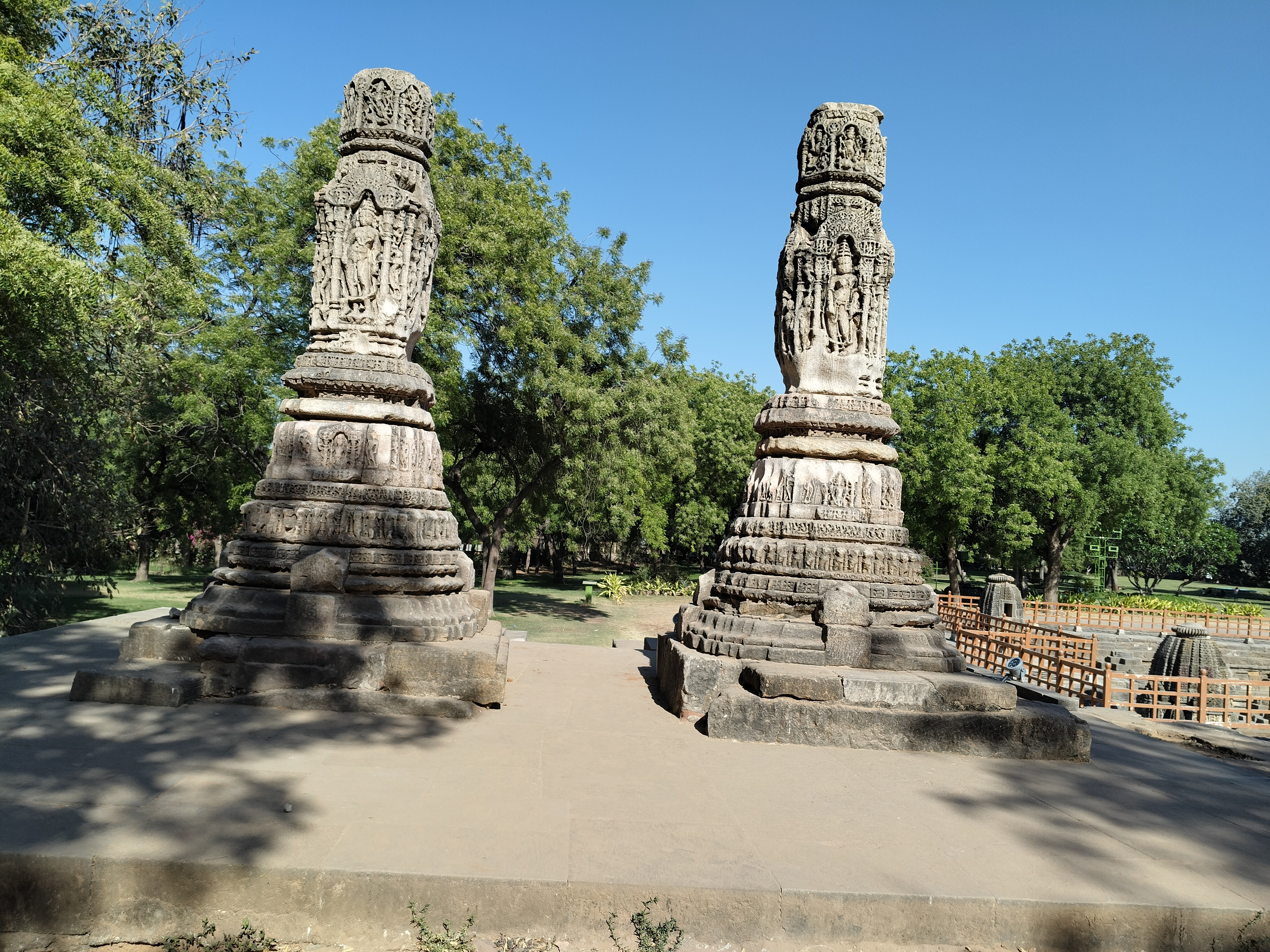
Two pillars standing alone near the Sun Temple

It follows capital similar to small pillars crowned with makara brackets if eight stilted pillar and dwarfs in the rests. Each of the eight stilted pillars includes an additional shaft and a capital of similar type, surmounted by brackets adorned with volutes and pendant leaf motifs.

=== Iconography ===
The panels of the gudhamandapa feature a central depiction of Surya, suggesting the temple’s association with solar worship. Several figures of the panels are shown wearing West Asian attire including a belt and boots. Other niches and corners are adorned with figures of Shiva and Vishnu in various forms, as well as depictions of Brahma, Nāga and goddesses. The flat ceilings and lintels of sabhamandapa are carved with scenes from epics such as Ramayana.

=== Kirti-torana ===
A kirti-torana, the ceremonial arch, once stood in front of the sabhamandapa. Though the pediment and torana no longer exist, two of the original pillars remain. The mouldings and decorative motifs on these pillars are stylistically similar to those on the walls and pillars of the sabhamandapa. There were two more kirti-torana on either side of the kunda of which only one exists without its upper section.

=== Kunda ===
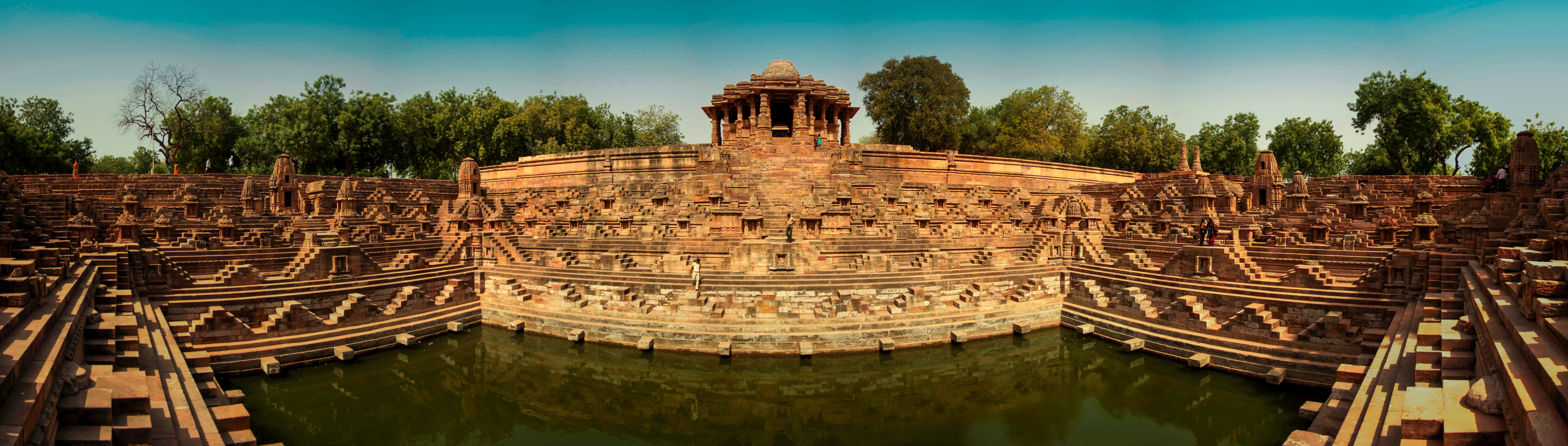
Panoramic view of the Kunda

A flight of steps through the kirti-torana leads to a rectangular Kunda, a tank or reservoir known as Ramakunda or Suryakunda. The Kunda measures 176 feet from north to south and 120 feet from east to west. It is paved with stones on all sides and includes four terraces, with recessed steps providing access to the bottom. The main entrance is located on the western side. Additional steps connect the terraces at right angle; these steps are rectangular or square in shape except the first step of each flight of steps, which is semicircular. Several miniature shrines and niches along the terrace walls contain images of deities including various Vaishnavite gods and goddesses such as Shitala.

== Modhera dance festival ==
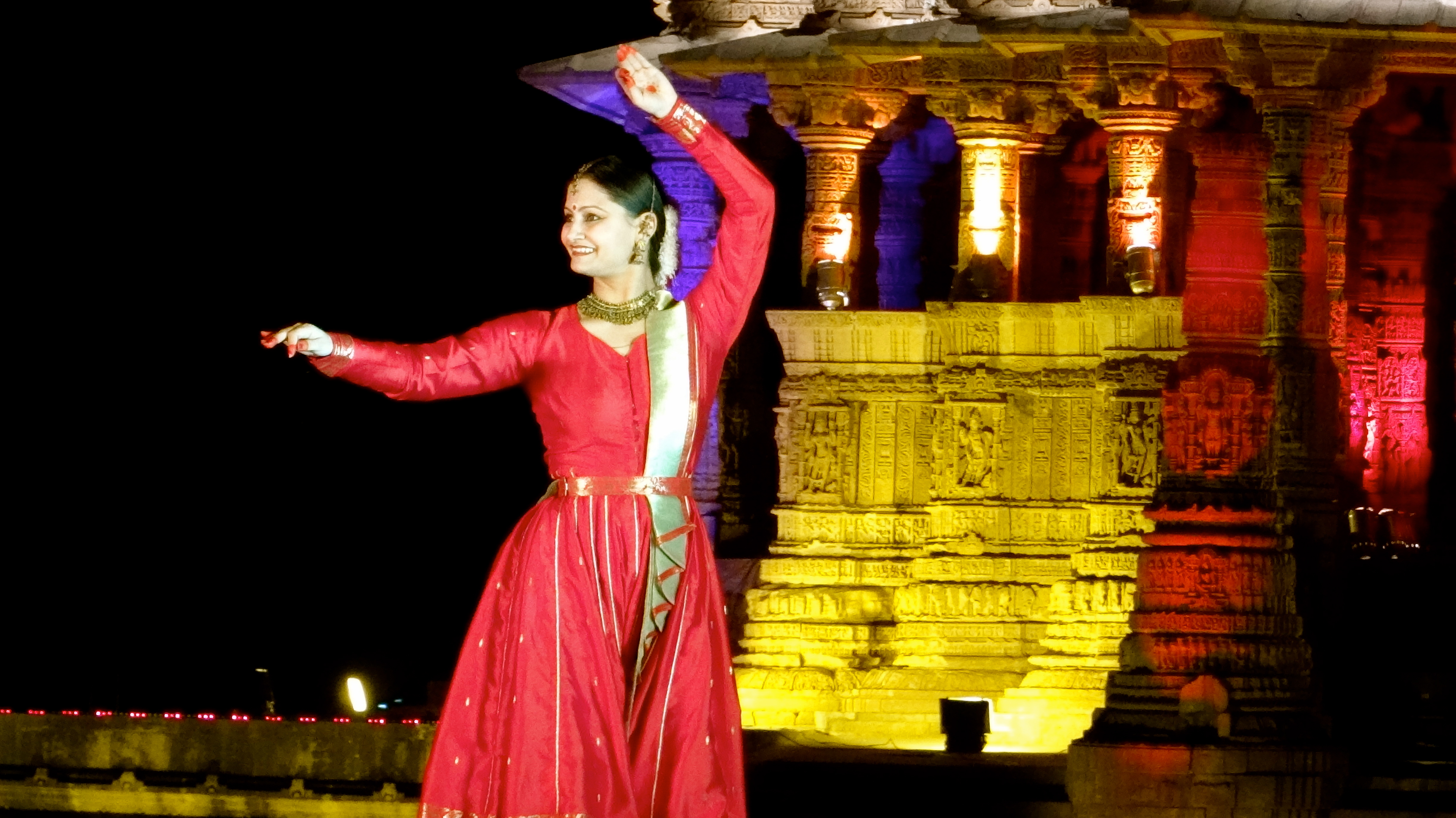
Kathak dancer Namrata Rai at Modhera Dance Festival

Since 1992, the Tourism Corporation of Gujarat organises an annual three-day dance festival known as Uttarardha Mahotsav at the temple complex during the third week of January, following the festival of Uttarayan. The event aims to showcase classical Indian dance forms in a setting that reflects the traditional atmosphere in which these performances were historically presented.

== In popular culture ==
Letitia Elizabeth Landon's poetical illustration "Hindoo and Mahommedan Buildings" refers to a coloured engraving depicting "a splendid sculptured Portico of a Temple dedicated to Mahadeo, at Moondheyra in Guzerat". In the poem, Landon reflects on the grandeur of the structure. The original painting is by David Roberts.

== Gallery ==
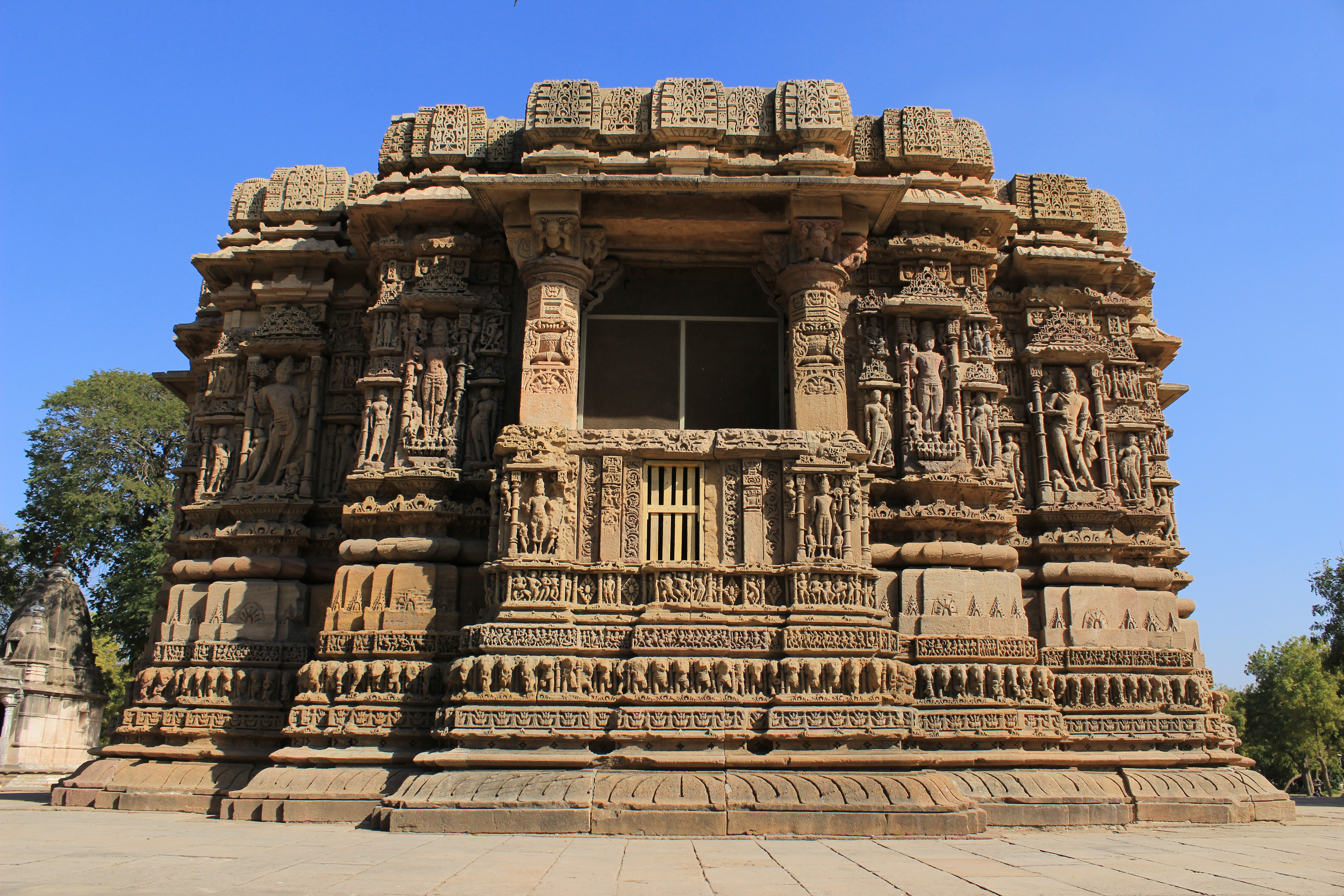
Back Side of SunTemple

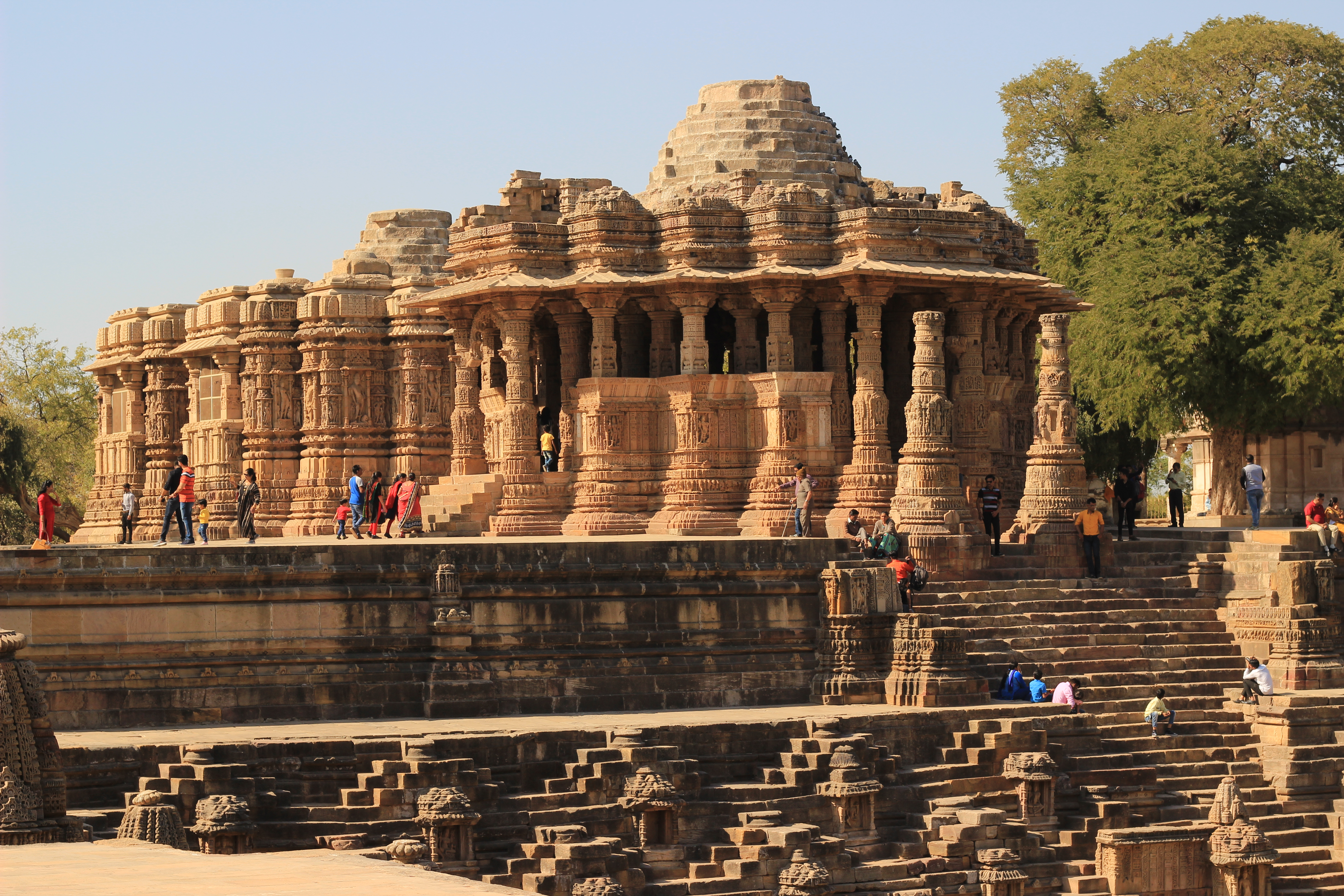
Side View

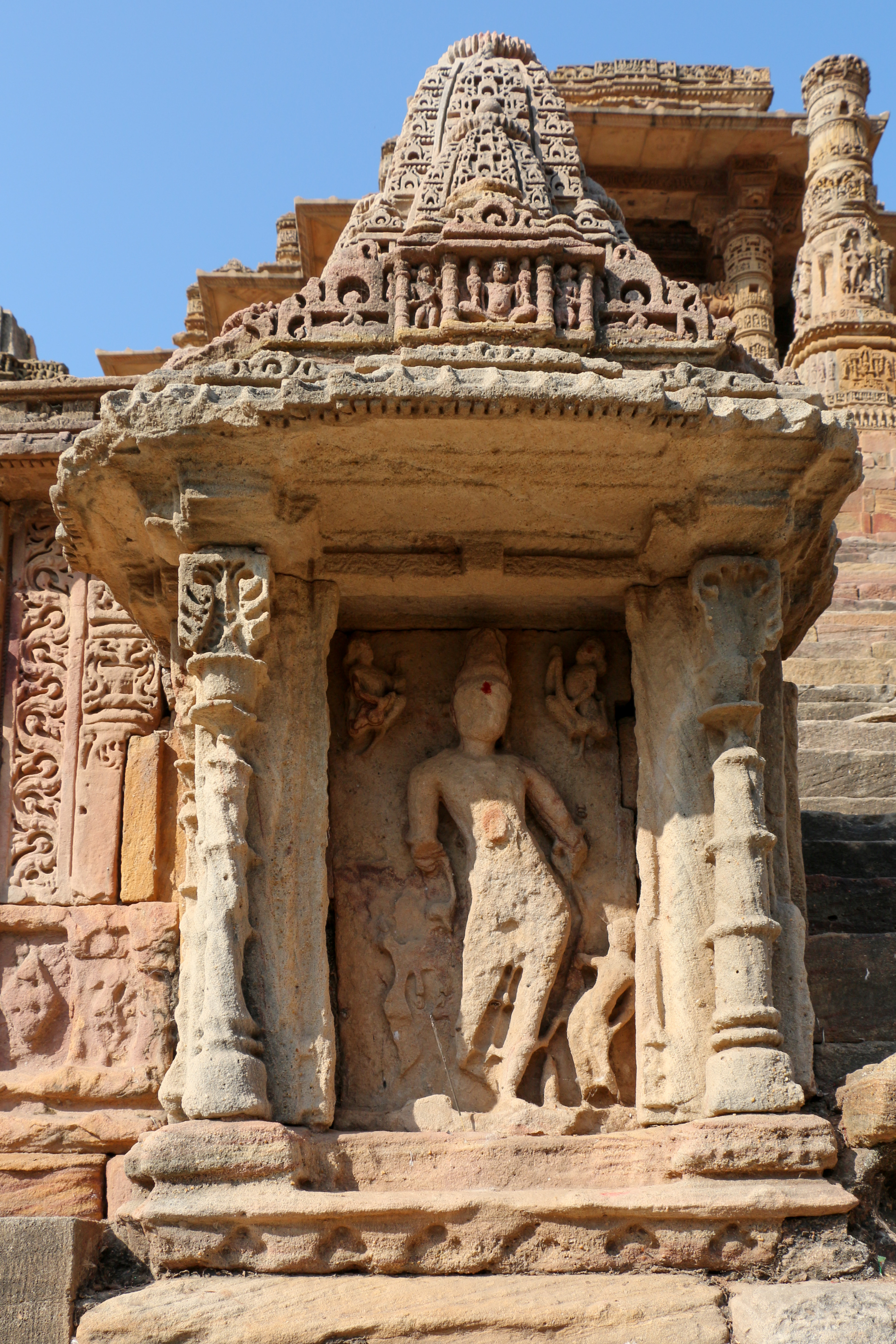
A sanctuary on the Surya Kund.

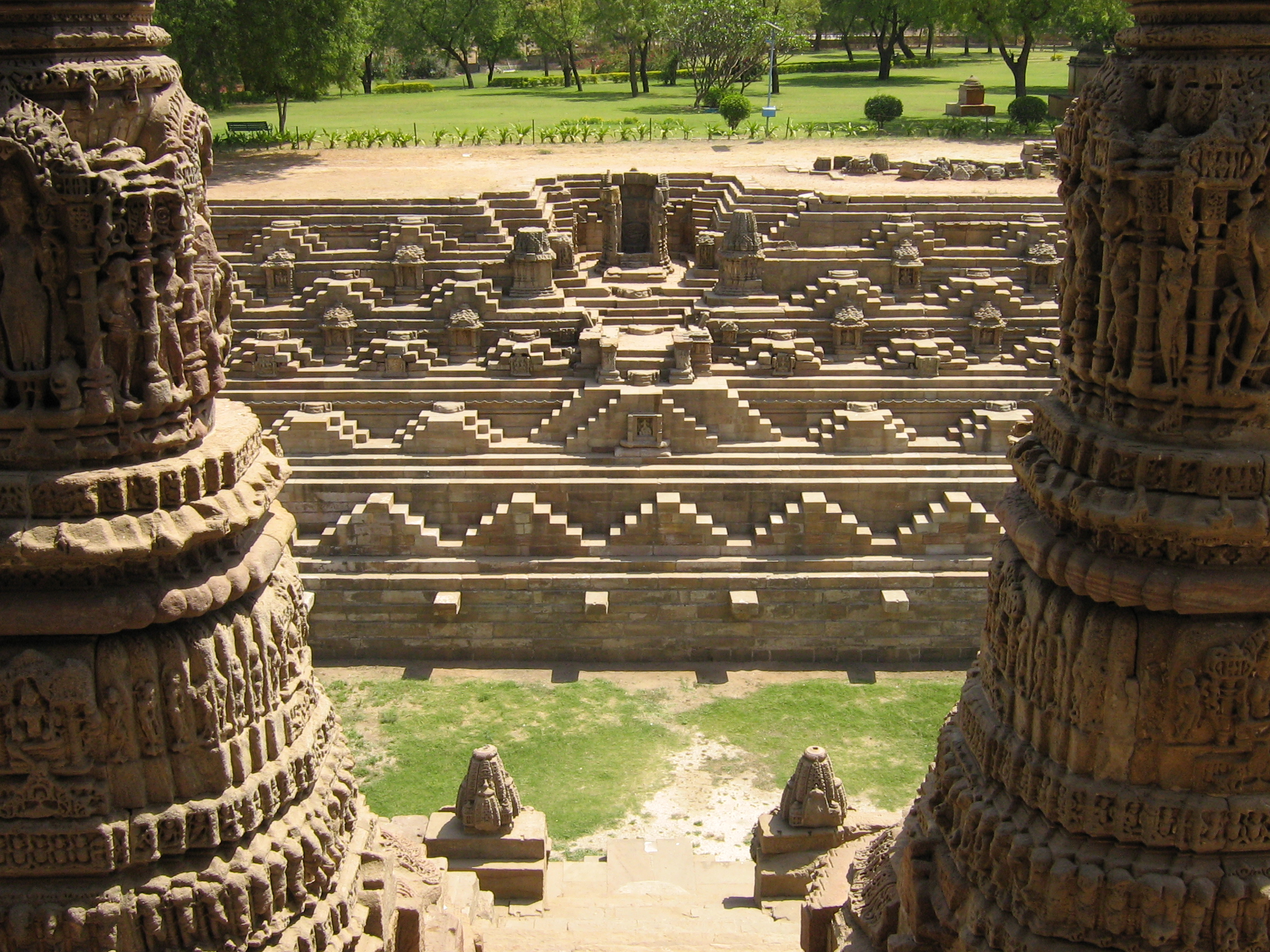
Massive pillars leading to the stepped tank outside the temple.

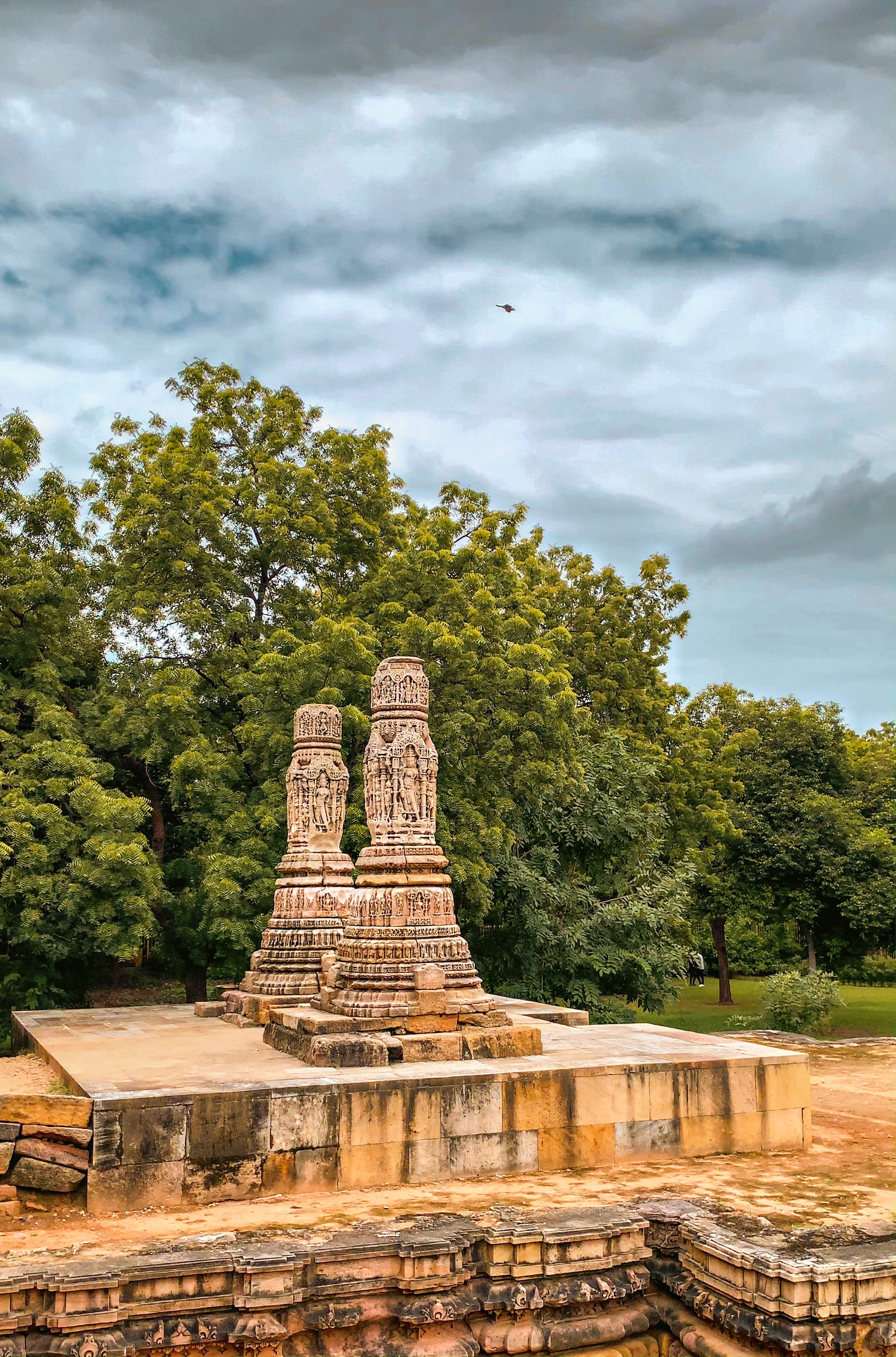
Two pillars standing alone near the temple.

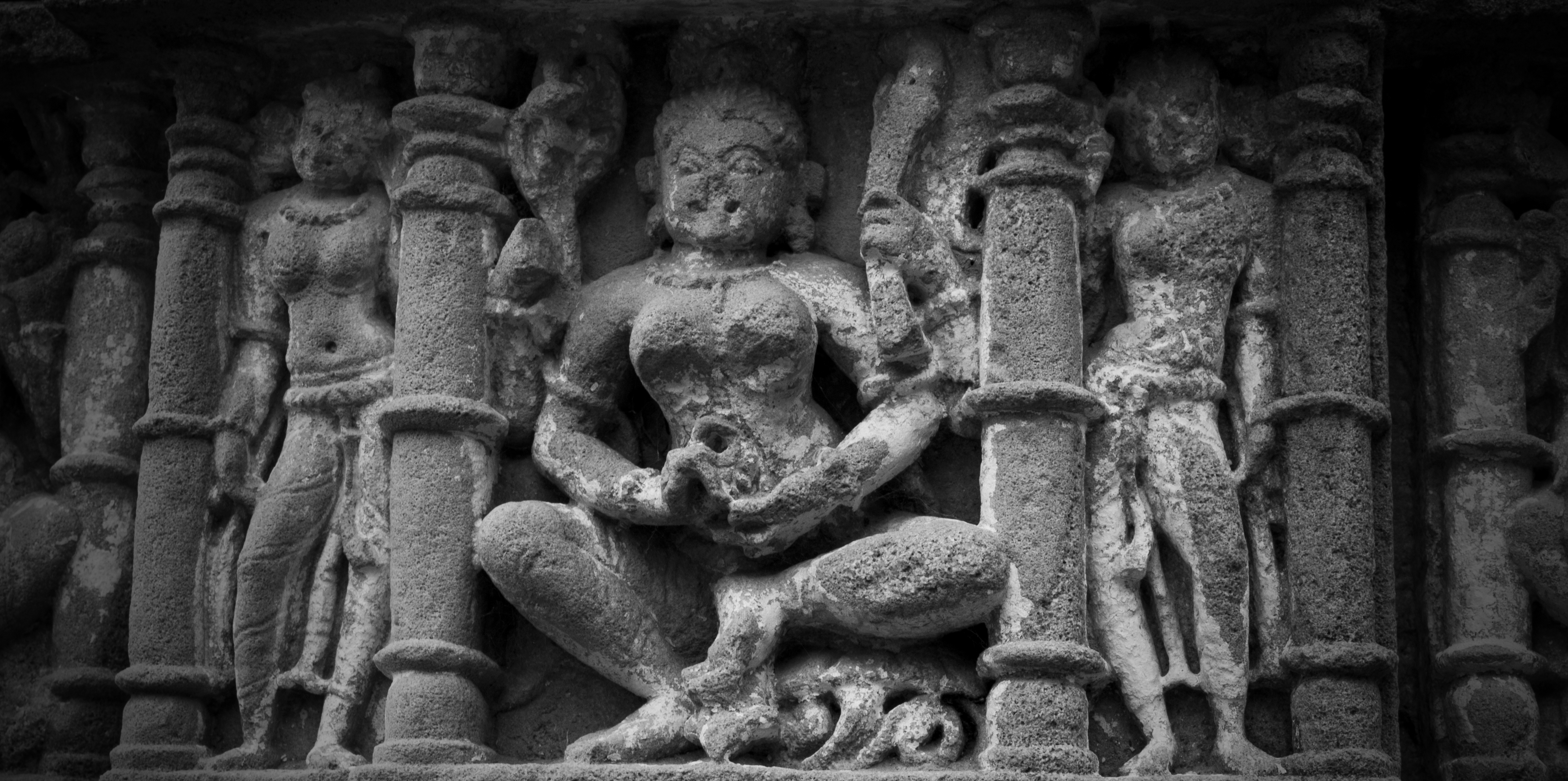
This is one of many sculptures present at the temple.

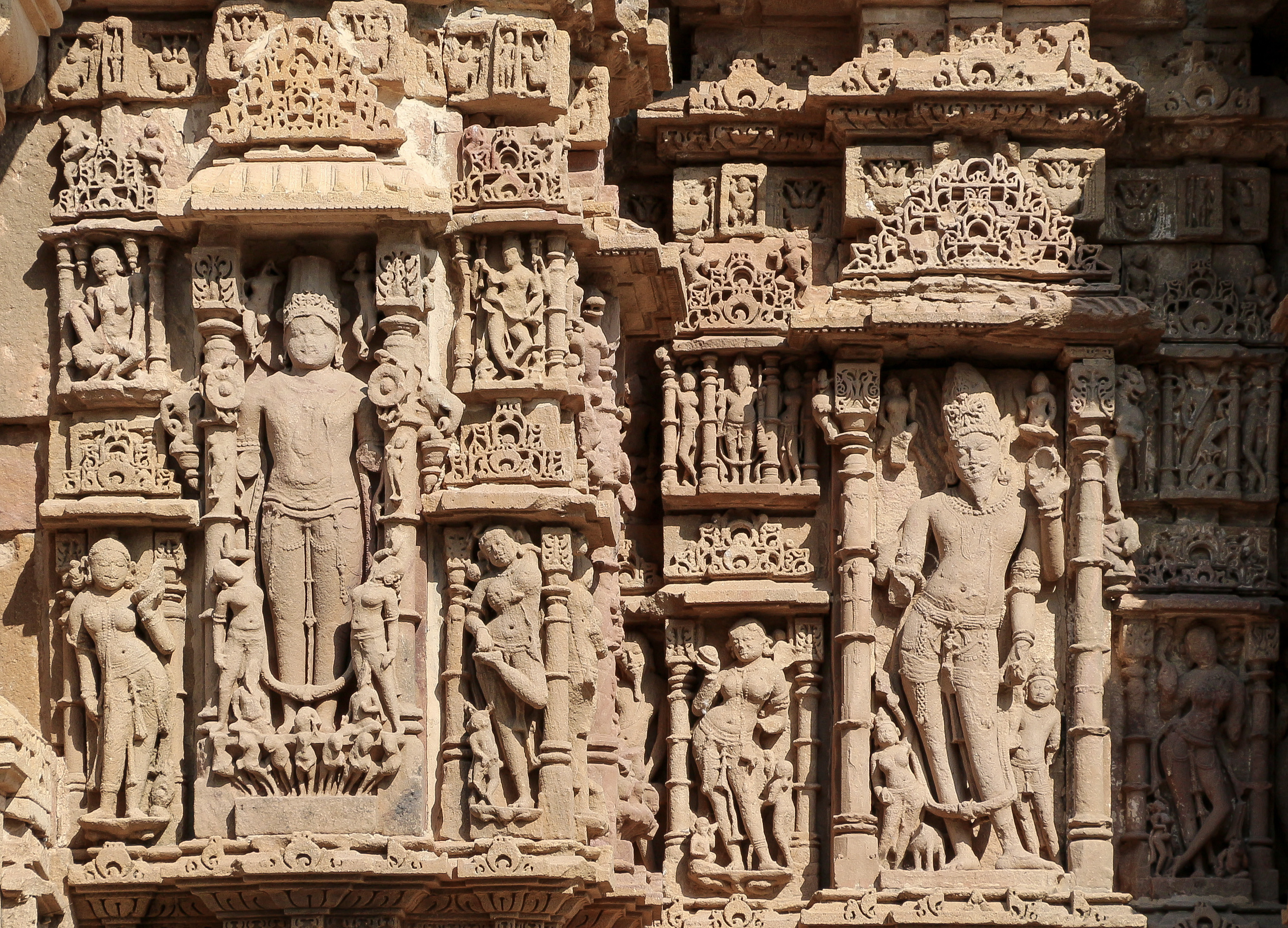
Reliefs on Gudhamandapa

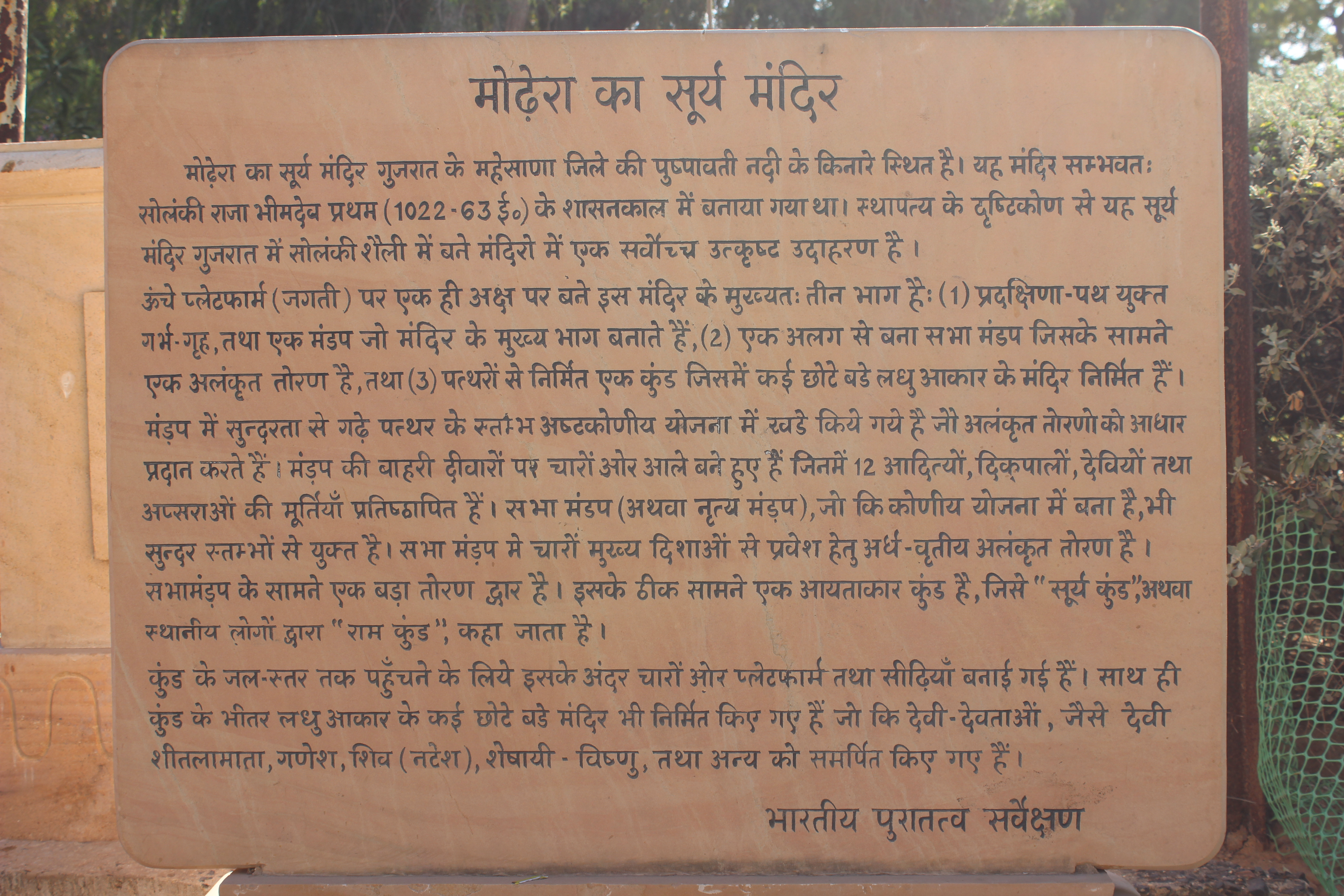
Information plaque in Hindi

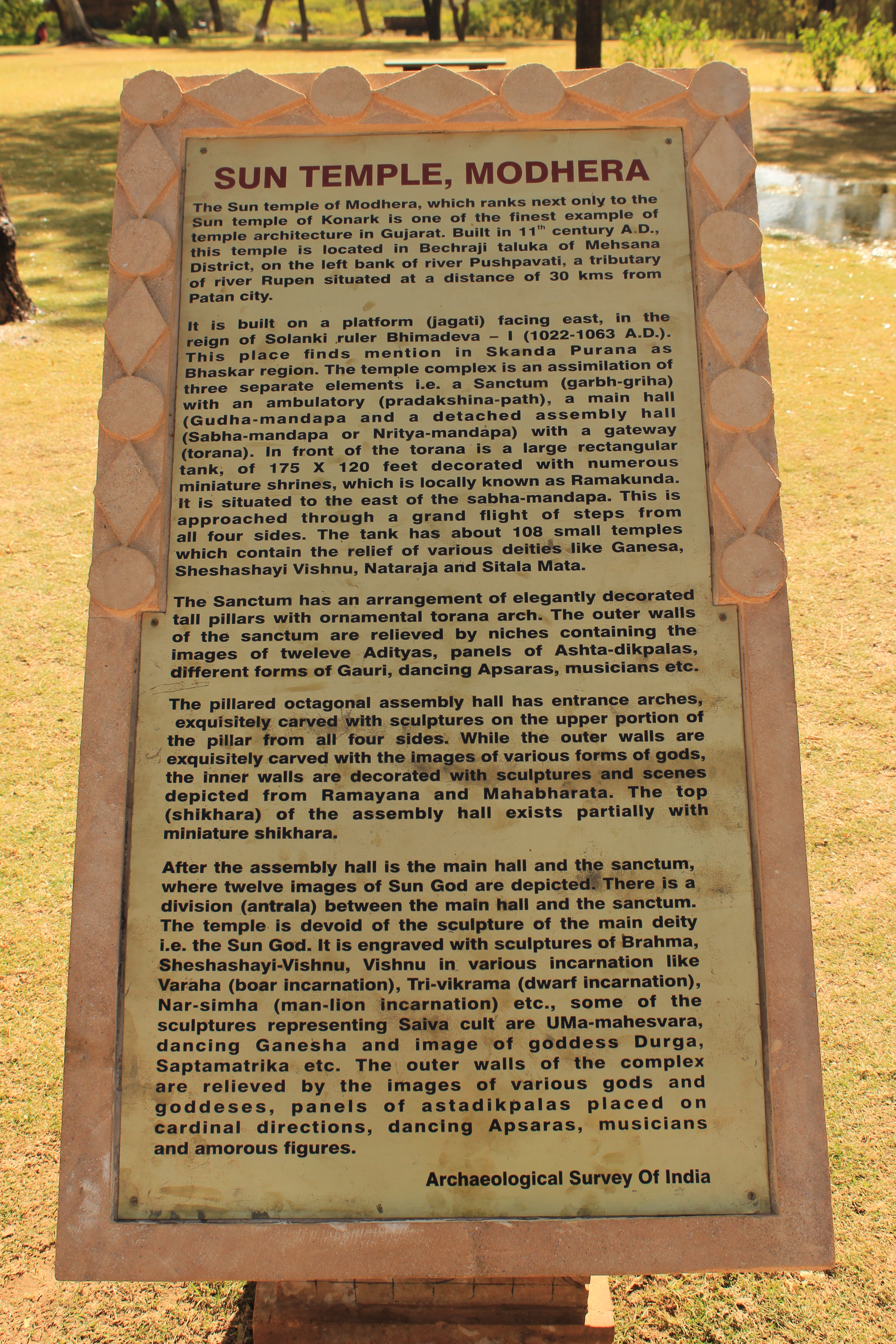
Information plaque

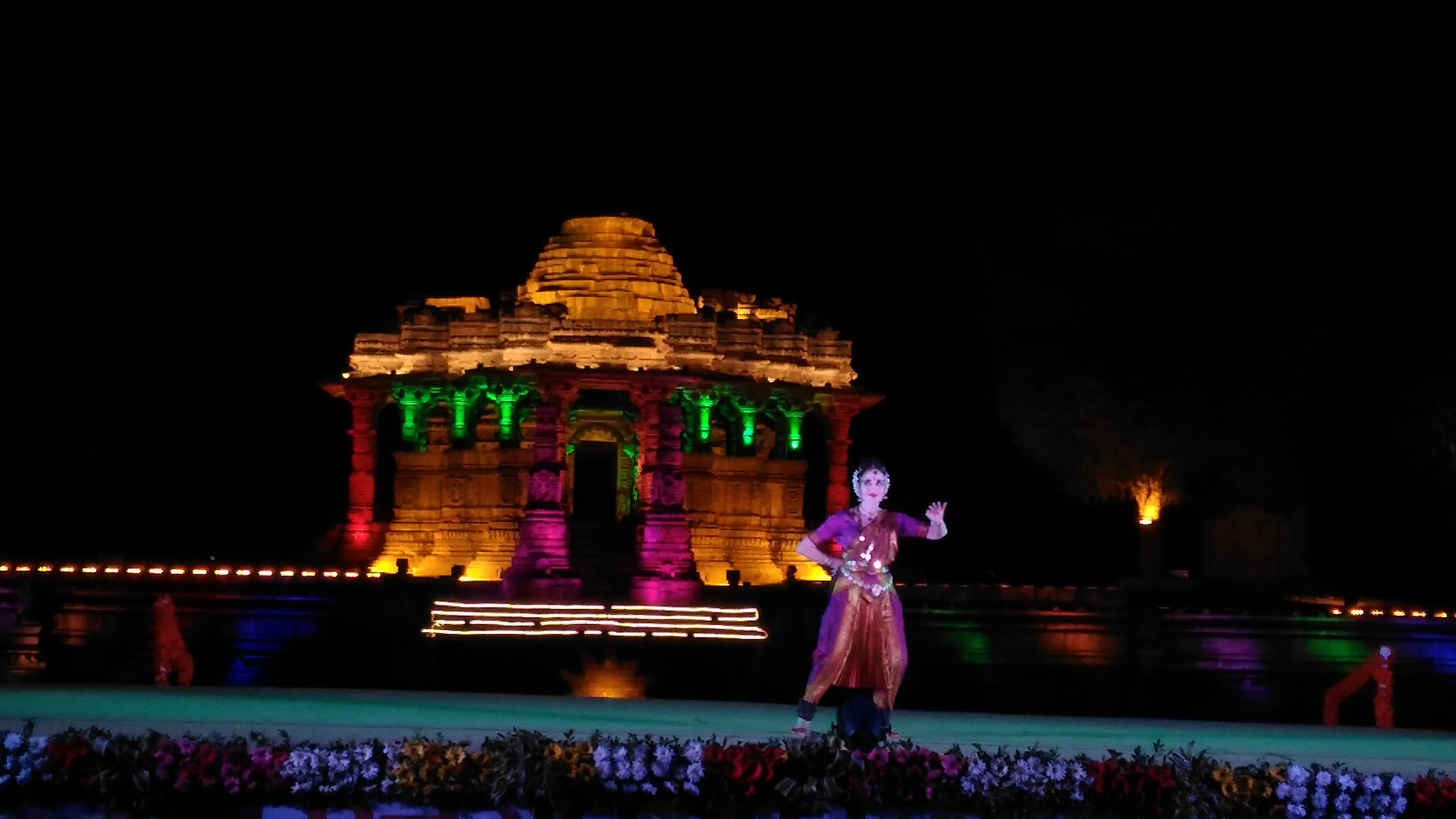
Uttarardh Mahotsav at the Temple

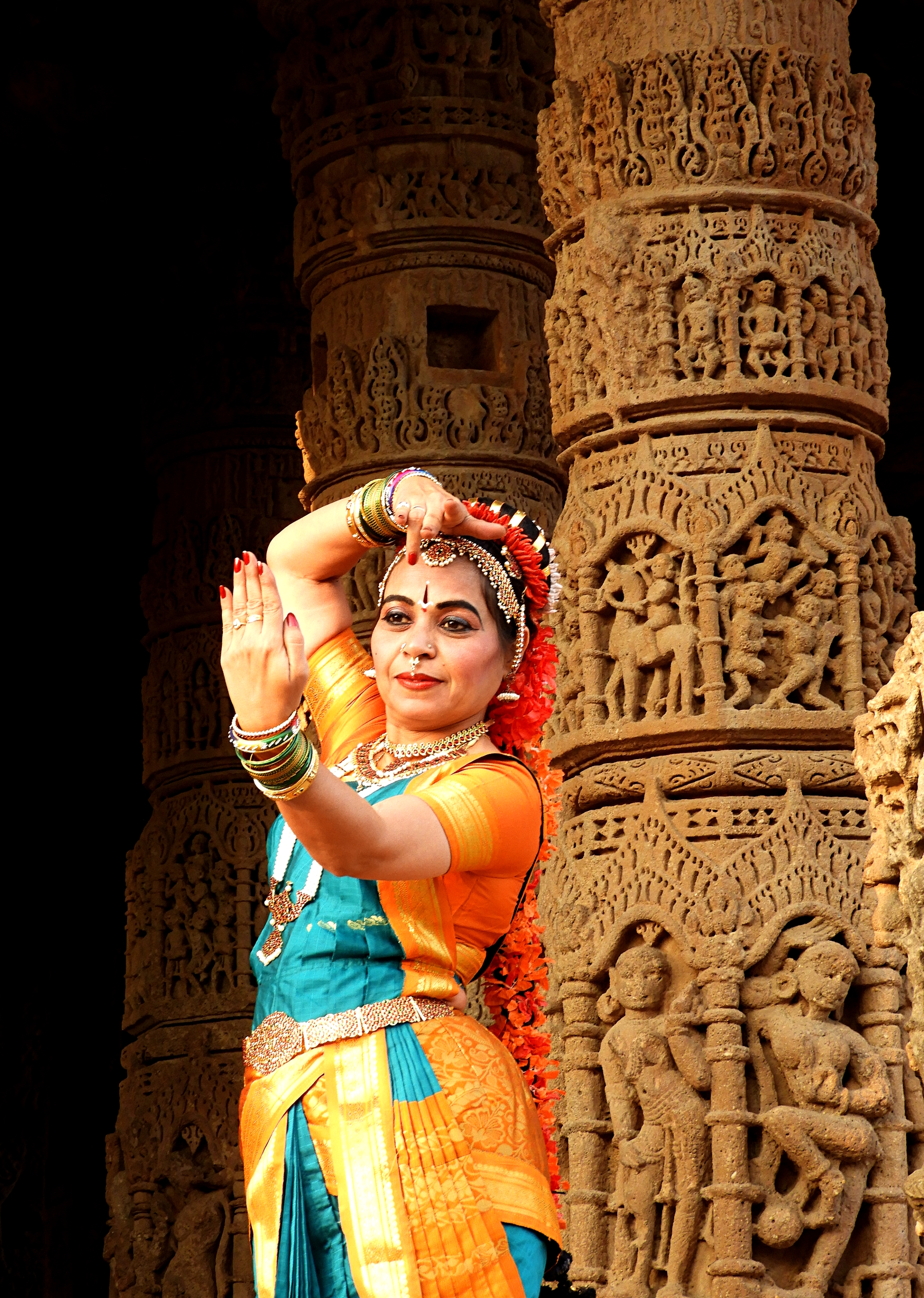
Indian classical dancer at the temple

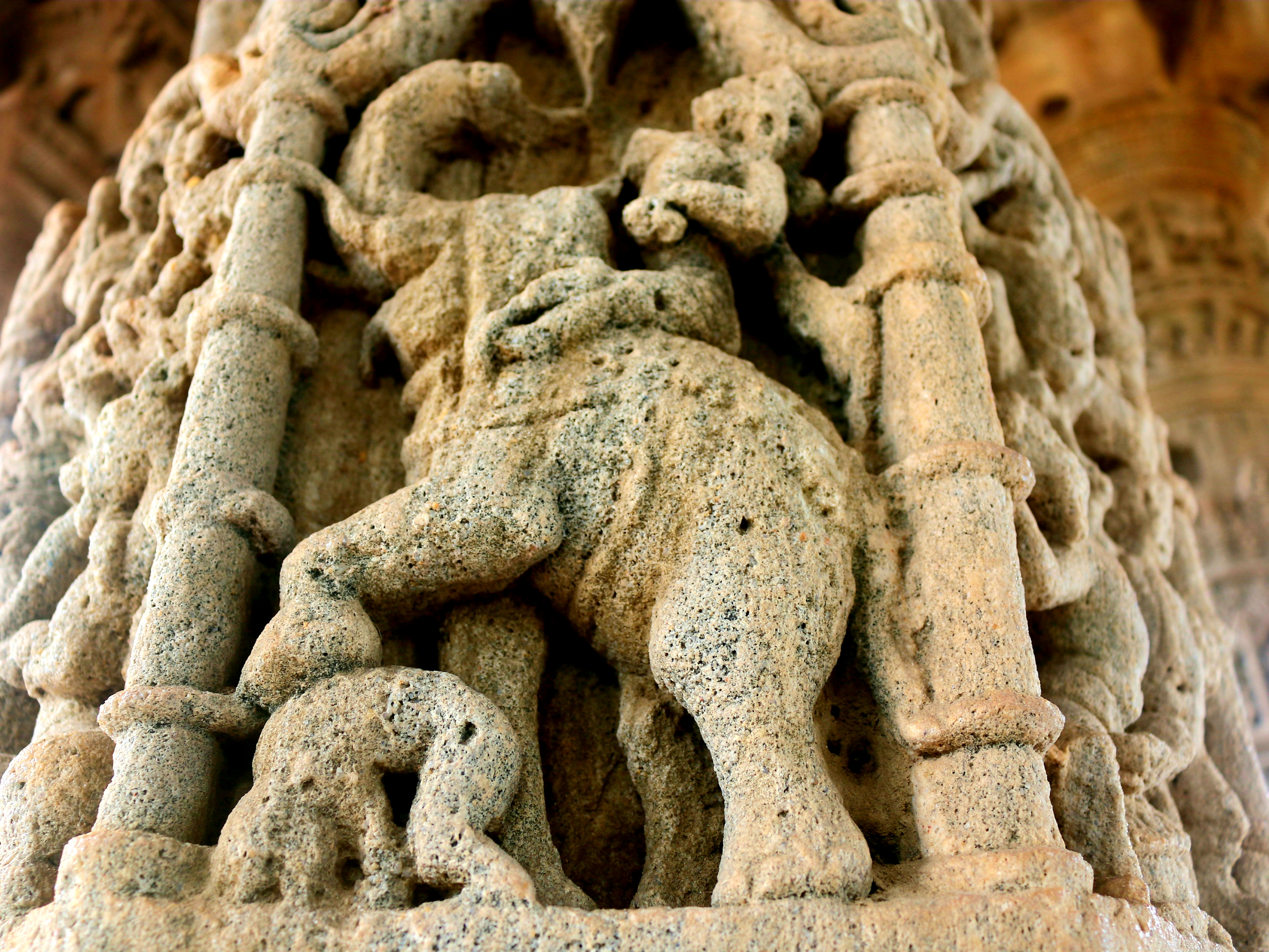
Execution by elephant carved on a pillar

== See also ==
- Becharaji
- Vav, Modhera
- Modheshwari Temple, Modhera
- Kirti Toran
- Rudra Mahalaya Temple
