= Modhera Vav =

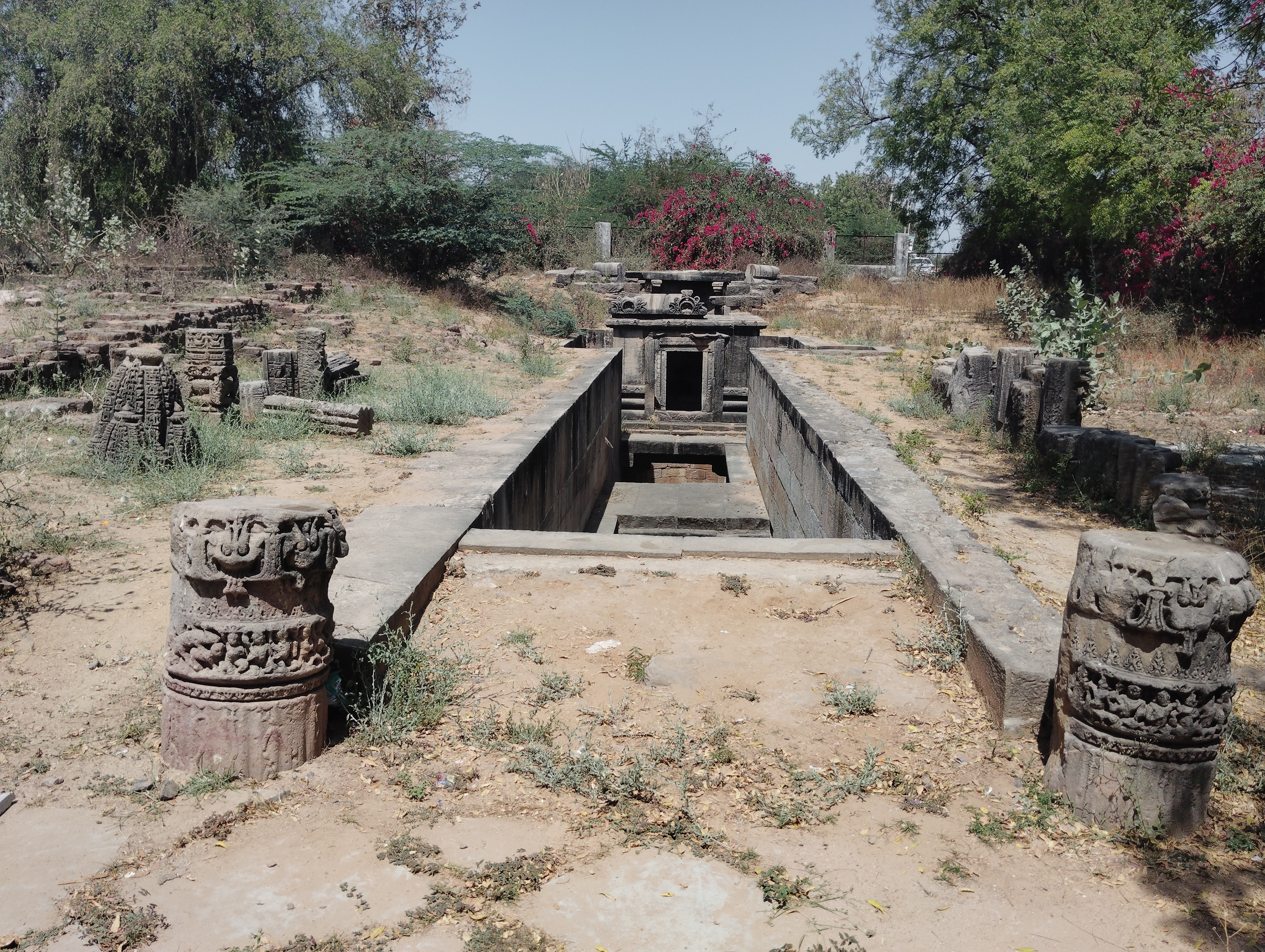
- Stepwell from the entrance side
- Interactive map of the Modhera Vav area

General information
- Architectural style: Indian architecture
- Location: Modhera, Chanasma Taluka, Mehsana district, Gujarat, India
- Coordinates: 23.582622°N 72.136998°E
- Completed: 11th century stepwell, 10th century mandapa
- Cost: $6 million almost

Design and construction
- Architect: Local

Modhera Vav is a stepwell in Modhera village in Mehsana district, Gujarat, India. The stepwell belongs to the 11th century while the mandapa origins from the 10th century. It is the state protected monument.

== History ==
The stepwell is located about a kilometre to the east of Surya kunda of Sun Temple, Modhera. Formerly, it was considered that it belonged to the mid-10th century but now it is observed that the stepwell may belong to the 11th century with the mandapa above the second kuta (pavilion-tower) may belong to the 10th century which may have been a separate shrine moved from elsewhere to this stepwell.

It is the state protected monument (S-GJ-281).

== Architecture ==
The stepwell is small, moderately ornamented and is constructed using sandstone blocks and stone slabs. It has one entrance, three storeys and three kutas (pavilion-towers). The narrow stepped corridor is 2.50 metres (8 ft 2 in) broad. It features small, square pavilions supported by unornamented pilasters. These square ruchaka type pilasters have a simple design, except for a decorative volute-pattern on the brackets. The well-shaft includes three pairs of struts decorated with motifs of diamond (ratna) on the top and a kirtimukha below it. These struts would have supported structures for drawing water from the well.

The small mandapa above the ground level and located on the second kuta of stepwell displays characteristics of its early origin. It has a small simple single-celled garbhagriha (sanctum sanctorum) with the doorframe depicting lotus leaves pattern.

== Gallery ==
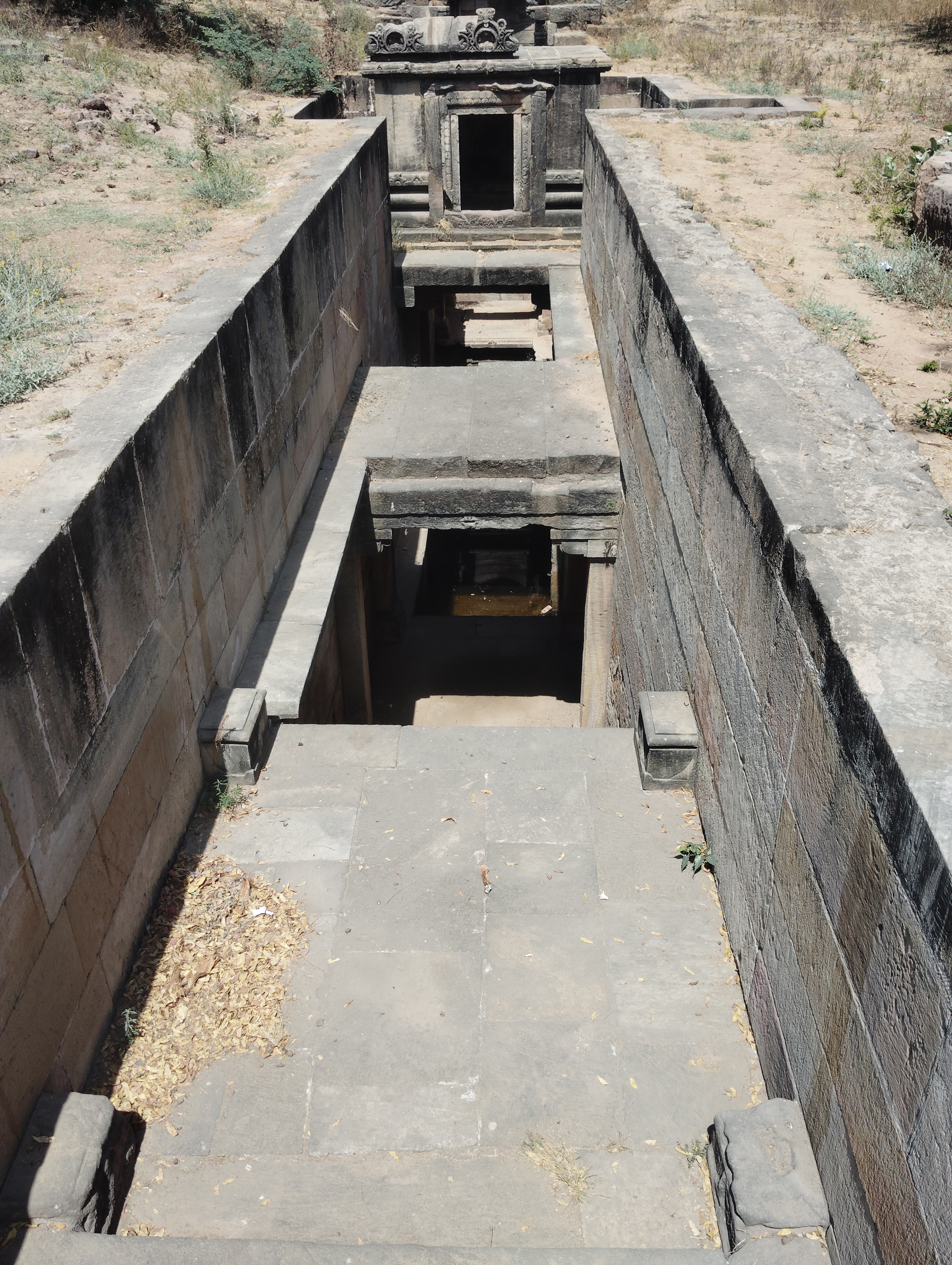
Three kutas (pavilion-towers) with mandapa on second kuta

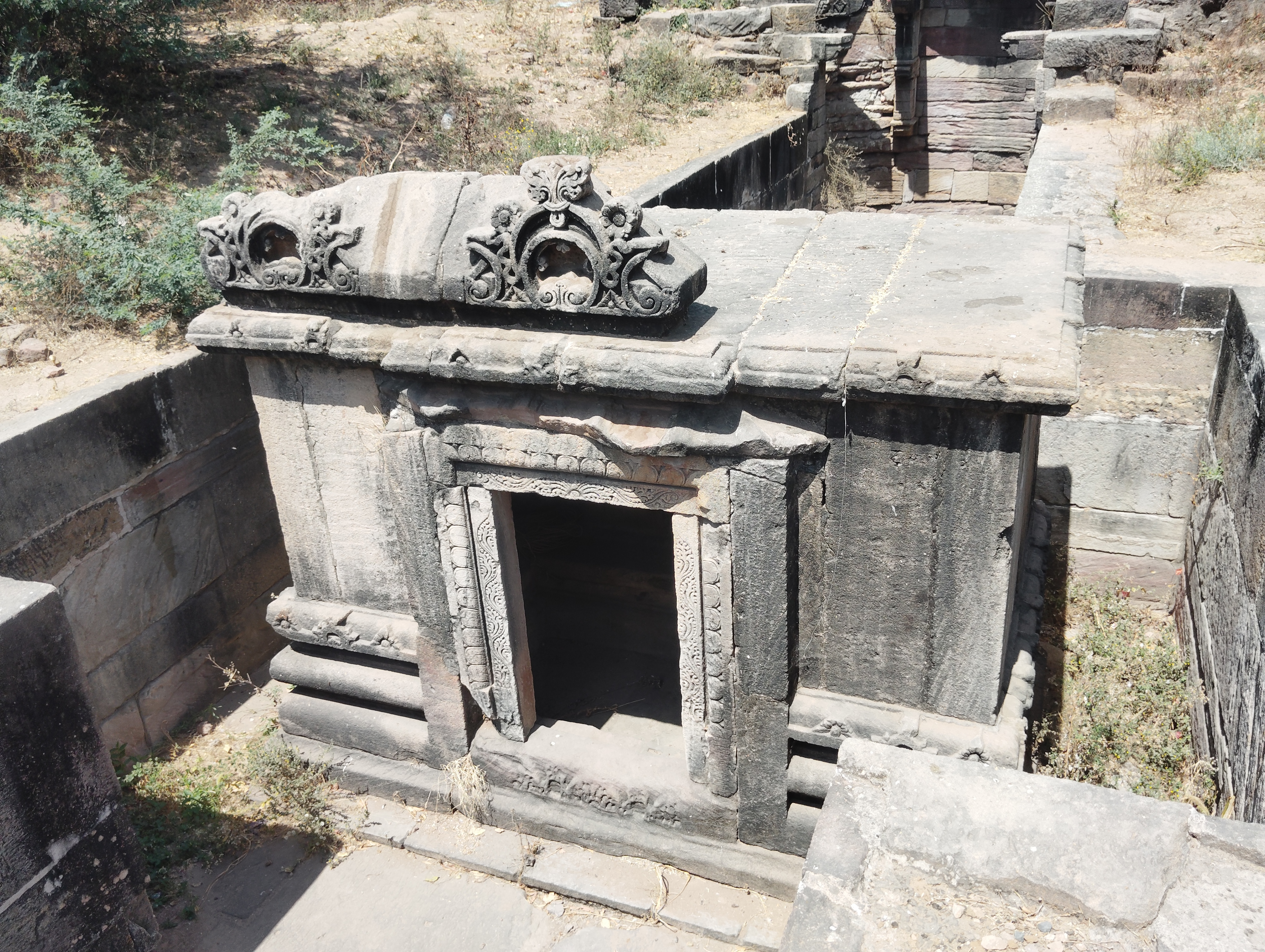
Mandapa with the doorframe depicting lotus leaves pattern

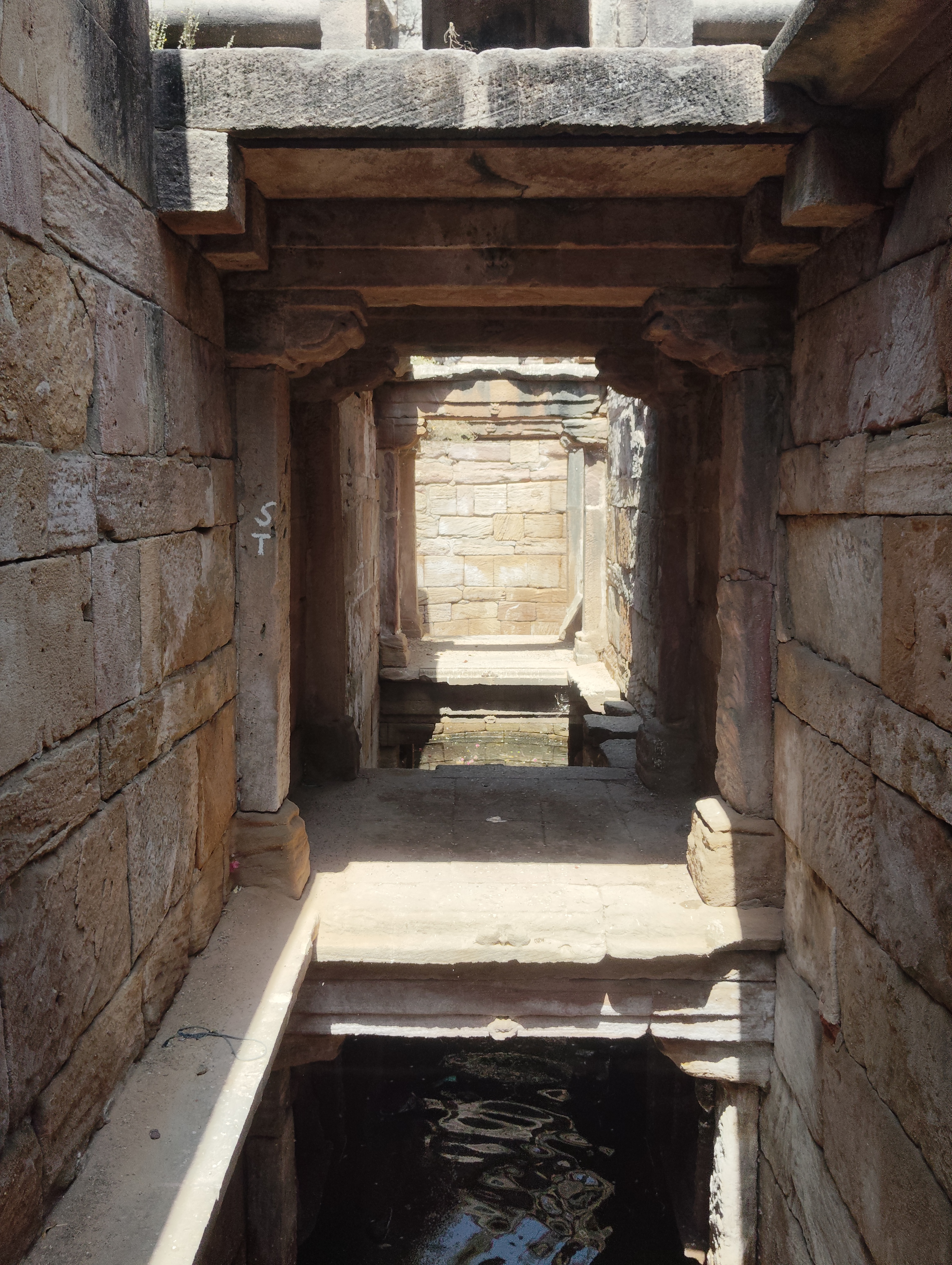
Square pavilions supported by unornamented pilasters

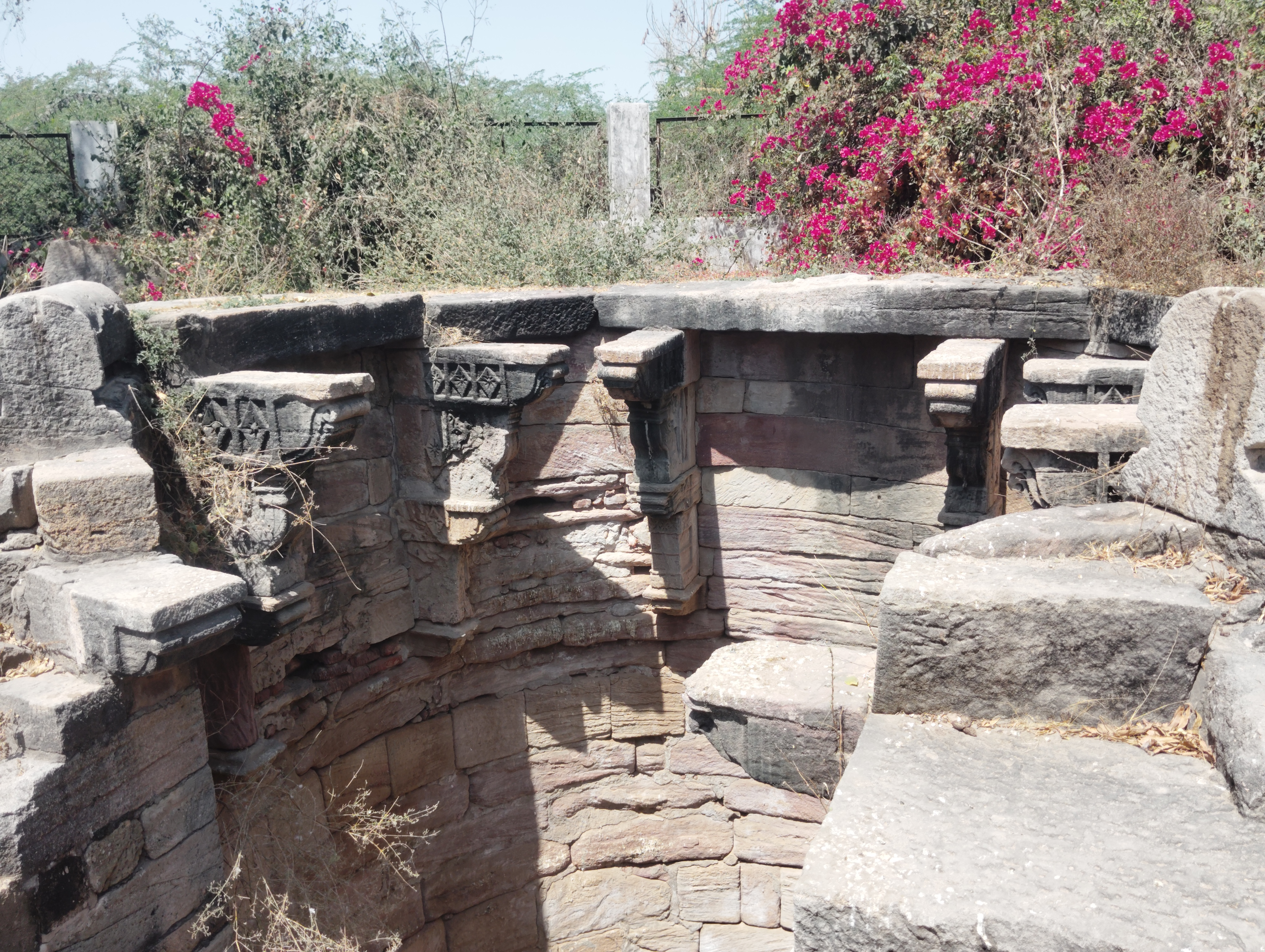
Well-shaft with three pairs of struts decorated with motifs of diamond (ratna) and kirtimukha

== See also ==
- Adalaj Vav
- Boter Kothani Vav
- Rani ki Vav
