= Slow and fast passenger trains in India =

Passenger train services of Indian Railways

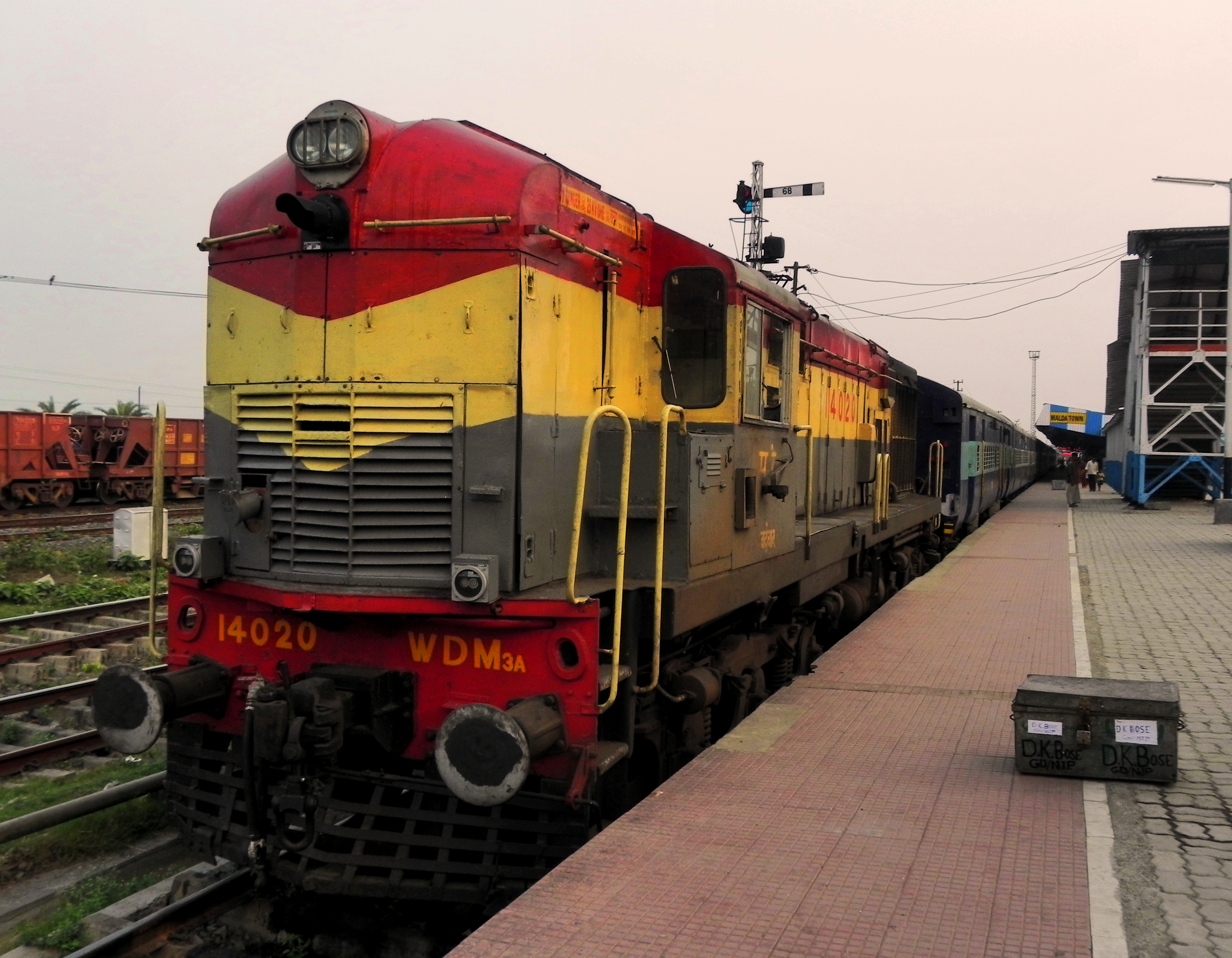
- Malda Town–Azimganj Passenger Train

Overview
- Service type: Connecting various states of India
- Status: Operating
- First service: 16 April 1853; 171 years ago
- Current operator(s): Indian Railways
- Website: http://indianrail.gov.in

On-board services
- Class(es): Unreserved Seating & Unreserved Sleeper
- Seating arrangements: Yes
- Sleeping arrangements: Yes
- Catering facilities: On-board catering
- Baggage facilities: Underseat

Technical
- Rolling stock: ICF rakes
- Track gauge: 5 ft 6 in (1,676 mm) broad gauge
- Operating speed: Maximum 40–80 km/h (25–50 mph)
- Track owner(s): Indian Railways

The Slow and fast passenger trains are passenger train services of Indian Railways which connect small towns and cities to metropolitan cities in India. The classification Passenger means it is an ordinary passenger train which halts at all or most of the stations on the railway routes. Currently, a total of 3572 passenger trains are running of all railway zones of Indian Railways.

== History ==
The country's first passenger train ran in Western India between Bombay Bori Bunder (now Chhatrapati Shivaji Terminus) and Thane on 16 April 1853. The 14-carriage train was hauled by three steam locomotives: the Sahib, Sindh, and Sultan. Travelling 34 kilometres (21 mi), the train carried 400 people. The line was built and operated by the Great Indian Peninsula Railway (GIPR). It was built in 1,676 mm (5 ft 6 in) broad gauge, which became the country's standard for railways. First passenger train from Eastern India, ran from Howrah (near Calcutta, now Kolkata) to Hoogly, a distance of 24 miles (39 km), on 15 August 1854. The line was built and operated by the East Indian Railway Company (EIR). First passenger train from Southern India, ran from Royapuram–Veyasarapady (Madras) (now Chennai) to Wallajah Road in Arcot, a distance of 60 miles (97 km), on 1 July 1856. It was built and operated by the Madras Railway.

First electric passenger train in the country, ran from Victoria Terminus (now Chhatrapati Shivaji Terminus) to Kurla on the Harbour Branch of Great Indian Peninsula Railway on 3 February 1925 using 1500 V DC overhead traction. In 1957, the first diesel passenger train ran in the country.

In 1993, the Integral Coach Factory started production of EMU's DMU's and MEMU's. After productions of both series, the first MEMU train started running between Asansol and Burdwan (now Barddhaman) on 11 July 1994. And later, the first DEMU train was started running between Jalandhar and Hoshiarpur on 23 October 1994. On 15 July 2017, a solar-powered DEMU train was launched on the route of Delhi Sarai Rohilla and Farrukhnagar of Haryana for connecting the capital of India to the small towns with the aim of reducing the usage of diesel and more usage of electricity for a better environment and economically.

== Types ==
Trains are classified into four types:

- Slow passenger train: Locomotive-hauled. Stop at every station on the route, except abandoned ones.
- Fast passenger train: Locomotive-hauled. Skip some stops on the route, usually least-booked ones.
- Diesel Electric Multiple Unit (DEMU): Multiple Units. Stop at every station on the route.
- Mainline Electric Multiple Unit (MEMU): Multiple Units. Stop at every station on the route. Will replace locomotive-hauled trains on electrified routes.

In some cases, trains run as fast passengers on one section, while running as slow passengers on another section. Fast passenger trains generally run on longer routes as compared to slow passenger trains. These trains have unreserved coaches, for short-distance unreserved seating coaches are used and for long-distance both unreserved sleeper and seating coaches are used.

The slow and fast passenger trains are usually hauled by locomotives such as WAM-4, WAG-5, WAG-7, for electrified routes and WDM-2 for non-electrified/semi-electrified routes. On the other hand, the DEMUs and MEMUs are multiple units, have cabs at both ends, resulting in quicker turnaround times, reduced crewing costs, and enhanced safety. So, IR is progressively replacing all locomotive-hauled slow and fast passenger and intercity trains with DEMUs and MEMUs, starting from North Western Railway zone on 1 October 2015.

== Trivia ==
Longest-running

Currently, the longest route of a slow passenger train running in India is Tatanagar–Itwari Passenger (numbered 58111/58112) with a record distance of 887 km (551 mi) with an average speed of 35 km/h (22 mph).

Whereas, the longest route of a fast passenger train running in India is Howrah–Rajgir Fast Passenger (numbered 53043/53044) with a record distance of 658 km (409 mi) with an average speed of 28 km/h (17 mph).

Whereas after the second conversion of Slow Passenger train into DEMU, on 18 July 2018, the Guntur–Kacheguda DEMU via Dhone (with numbered 77281 / 77282) becomes the longest distance traveling DEMU train in India with a record distance of 623 km (387 mi) with an average speed of 35 km/h (22 mph). Before that, the first conversion of Slow Passenger train into DEMU, was on 1 October 2015, the Jodhpur–Hisar DEMU (with numbered 74835/74836) becomes the second-longest DEMU train running in India with the recorded length of 470 km (290 mi) with an average speed of 38 km/h (24 mph).

And currently, the longest route running MEMU train in India is Asansol–Varanasi MEMU (numbered 63553/63554) with a record distance of 481 km (299 mi) with an average speed of 31 km/h (19 mph).

Shortest-running

Currently, the shortest route of a slow passenger train in India is Barkakana–Sidhwar Passenger (numbered 53375 / 53376) with a record distance of 6 km (3.7 mi) with an average speed of 18 km/h (11 mph).

The shortest route of DEMU train in India is Garhi Harsaru–Farrukhnagar DEMU (numbered 74031/34 & 74035/38) with a record distance of 11 km (6.8 mi) with an average speed of 27 km/h (17 mph).

The shortest route of MEMU train in India is Jasidih–Baidyanathdham MEMU (numbered 63153/63154) with a record distance of 6 km (3.7 mi) with an average speed of 19 km/h (12 mph).

== Gallery ==
Exteriors

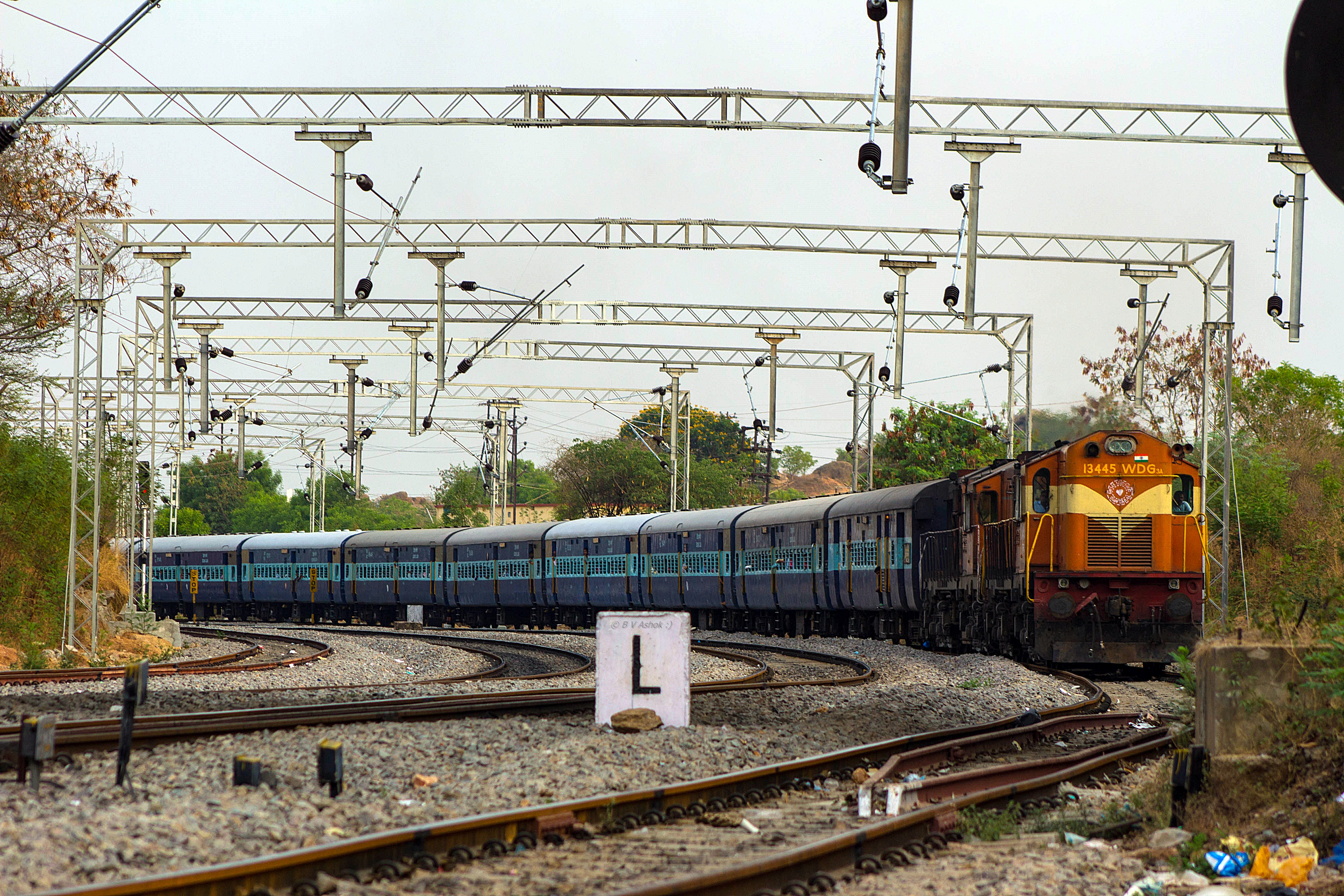
Kacheguda–Bodhan slow passenger train

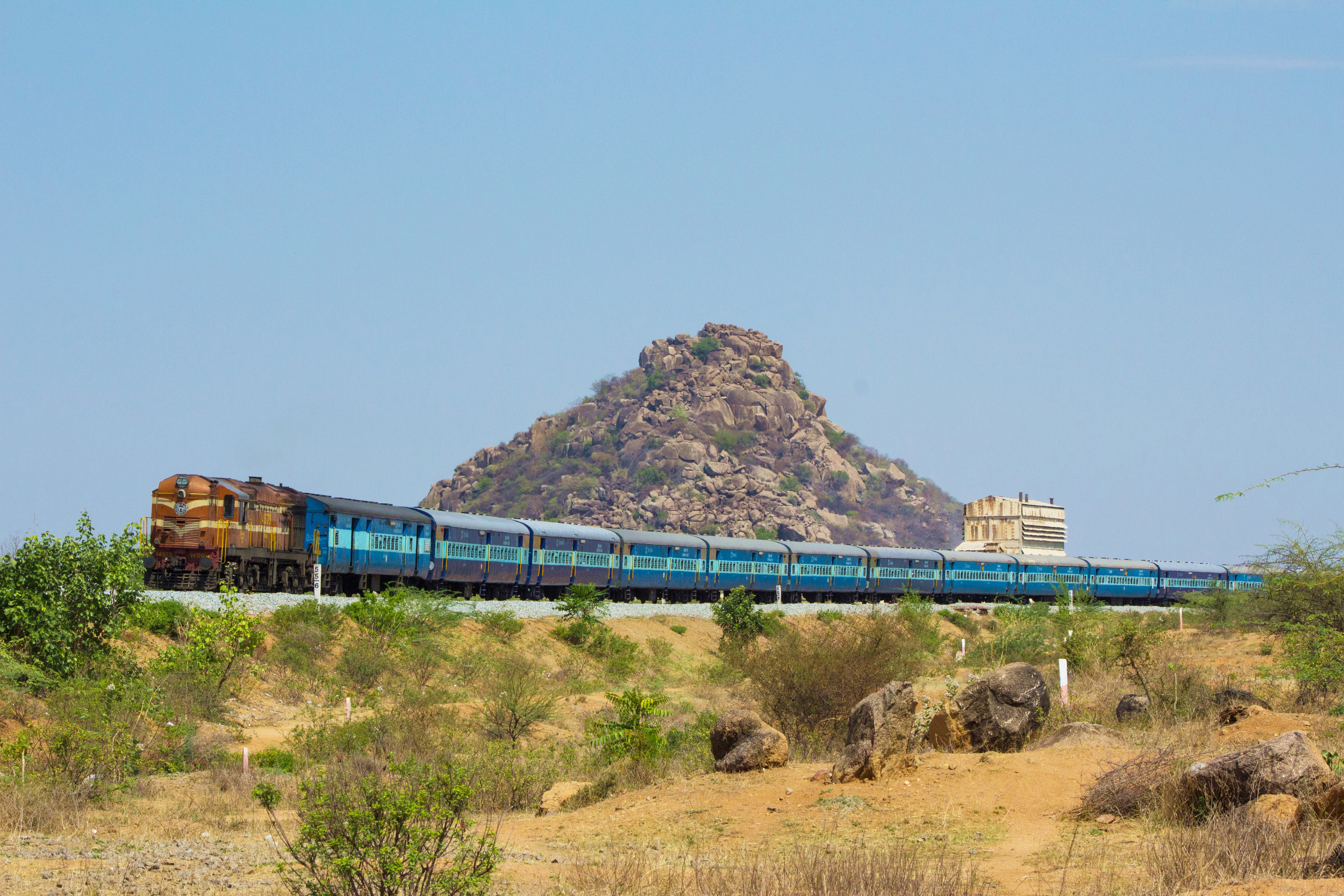
Secunderabad–Repalle fast passenger train

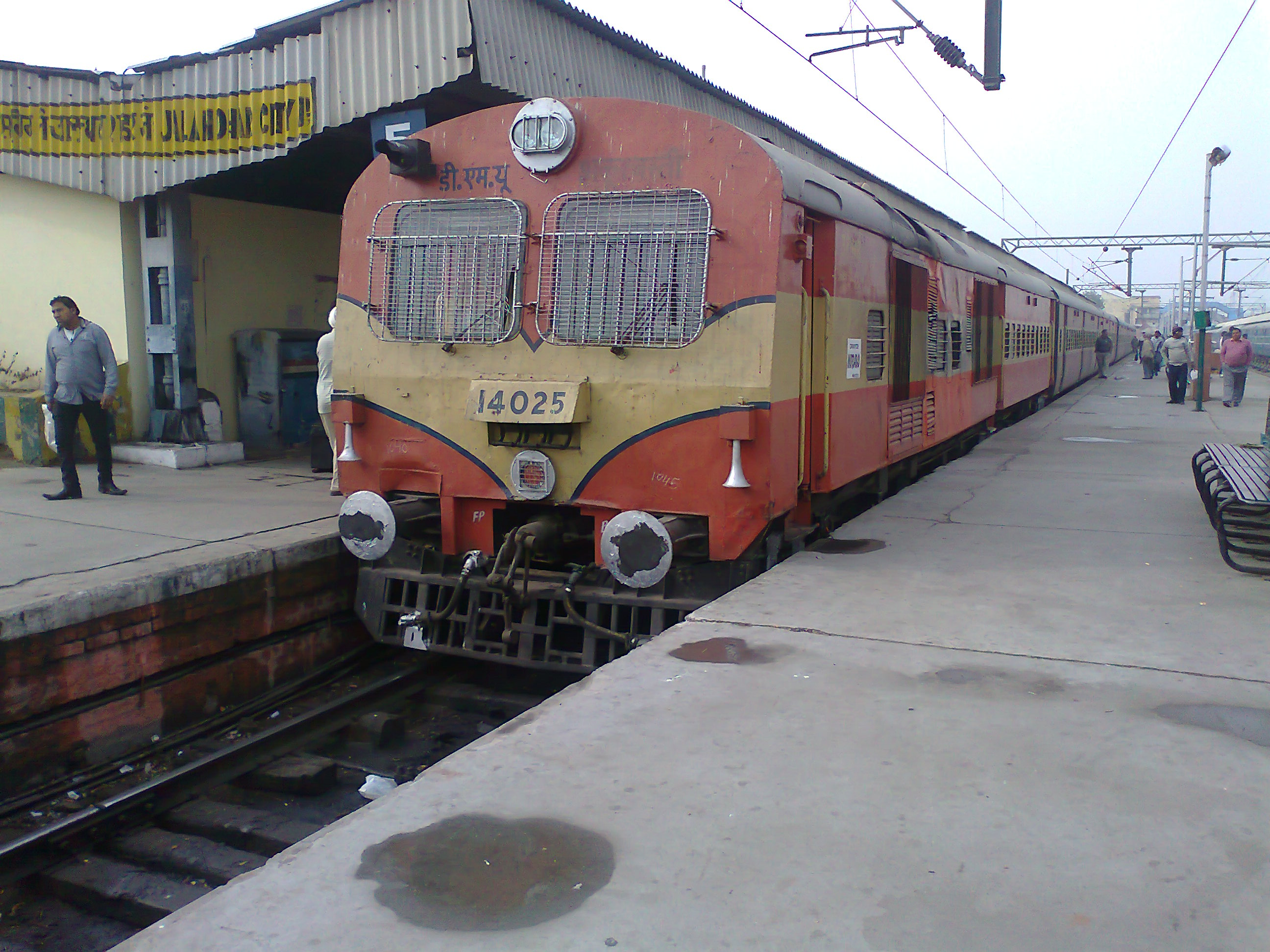
An old DEMU train

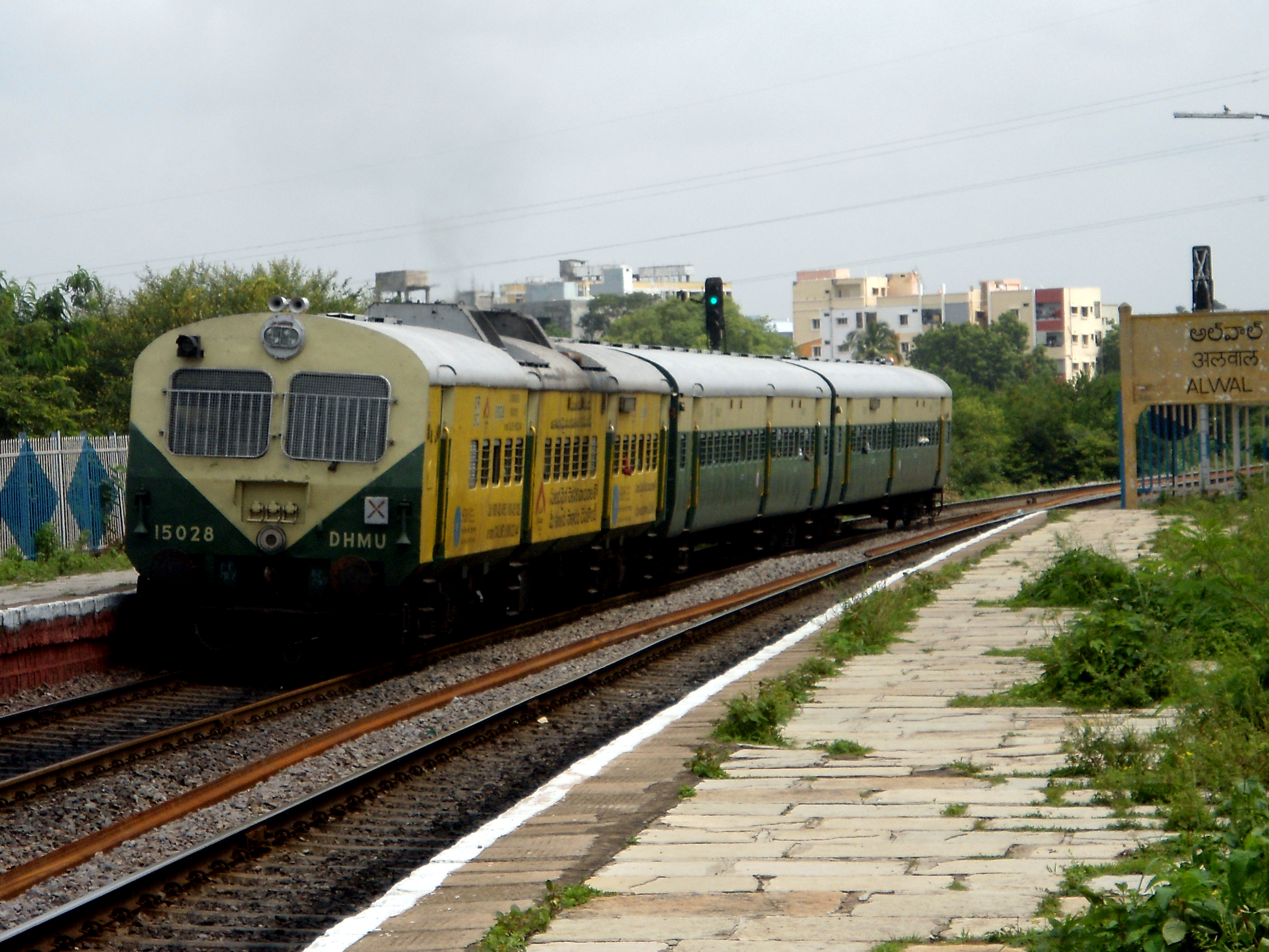
An old DHMU train

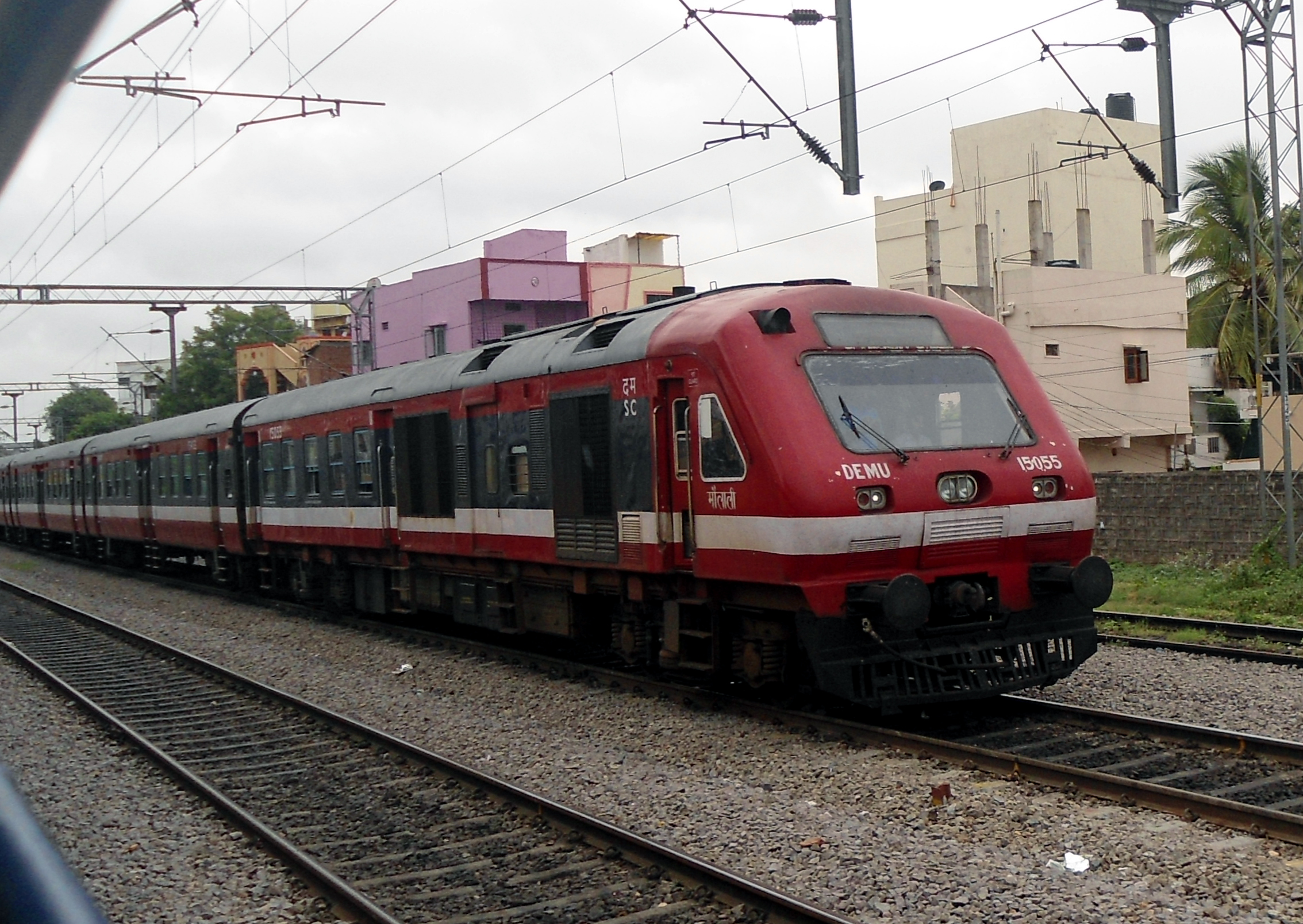
An aerodynamic-designed DEMU train

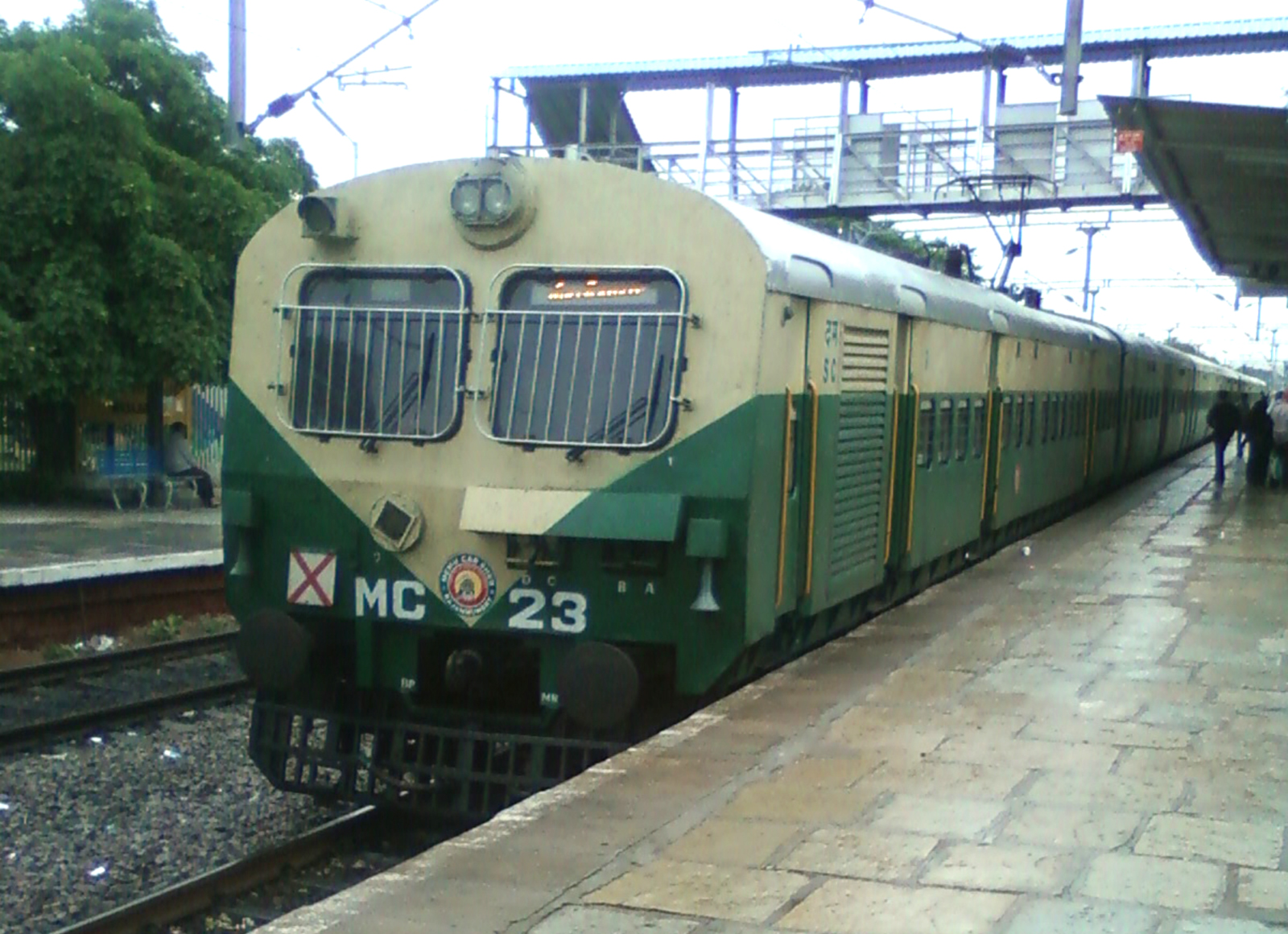
An old MEMU train

Interiors

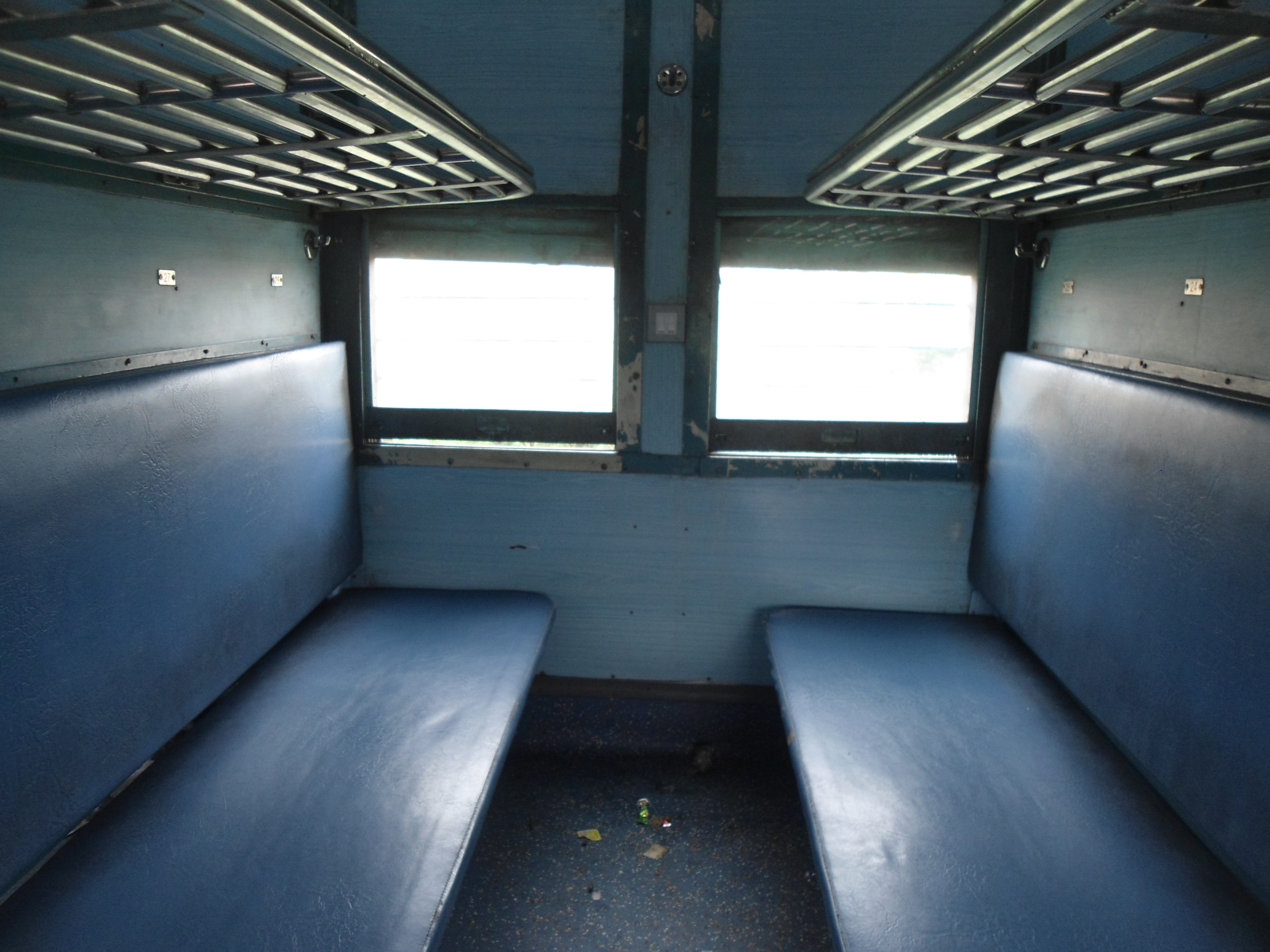
Window, middle and aisle seats of inside unreserved passenger train

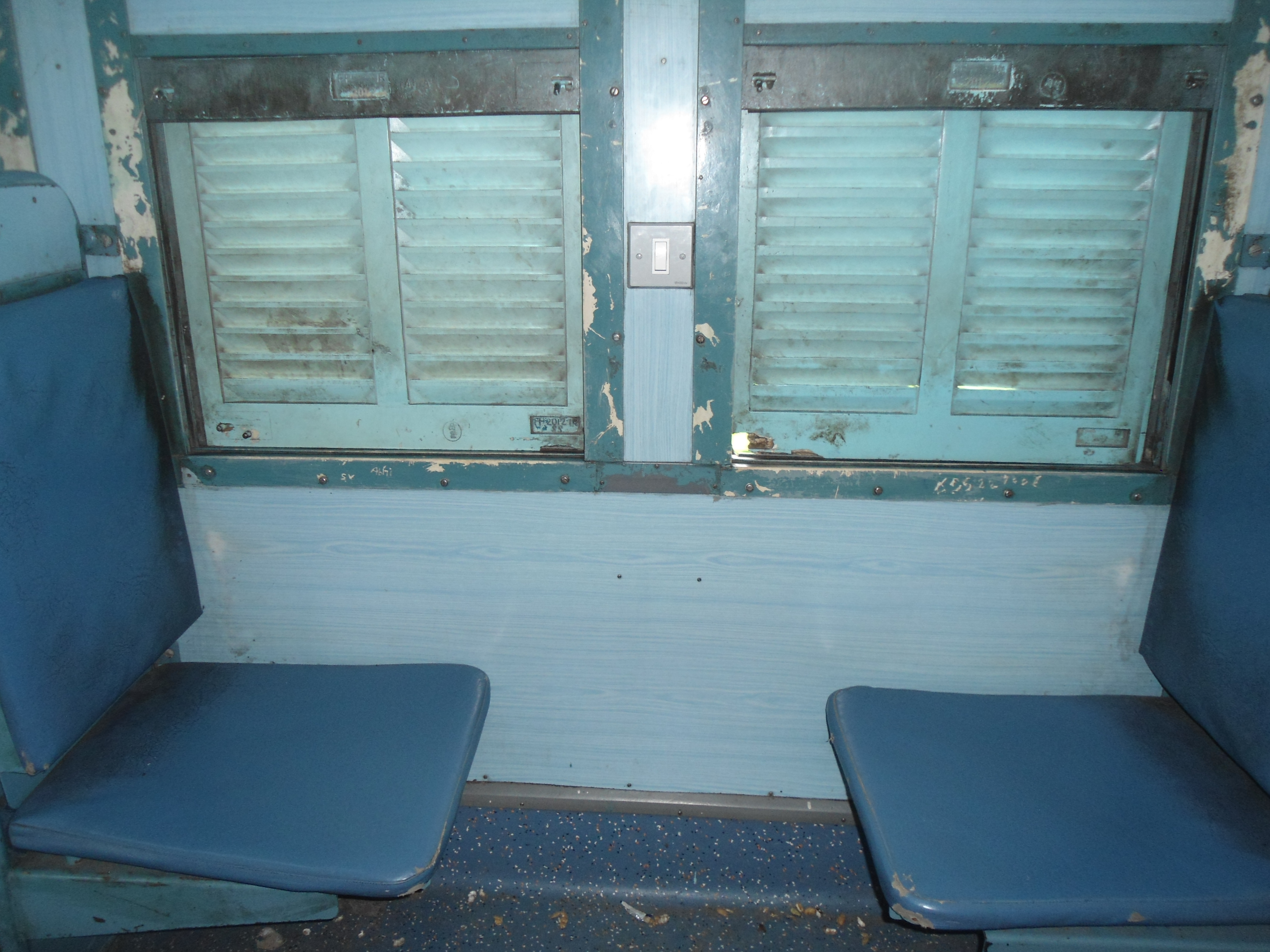
Side Window Seat of inside unreserved passenger train

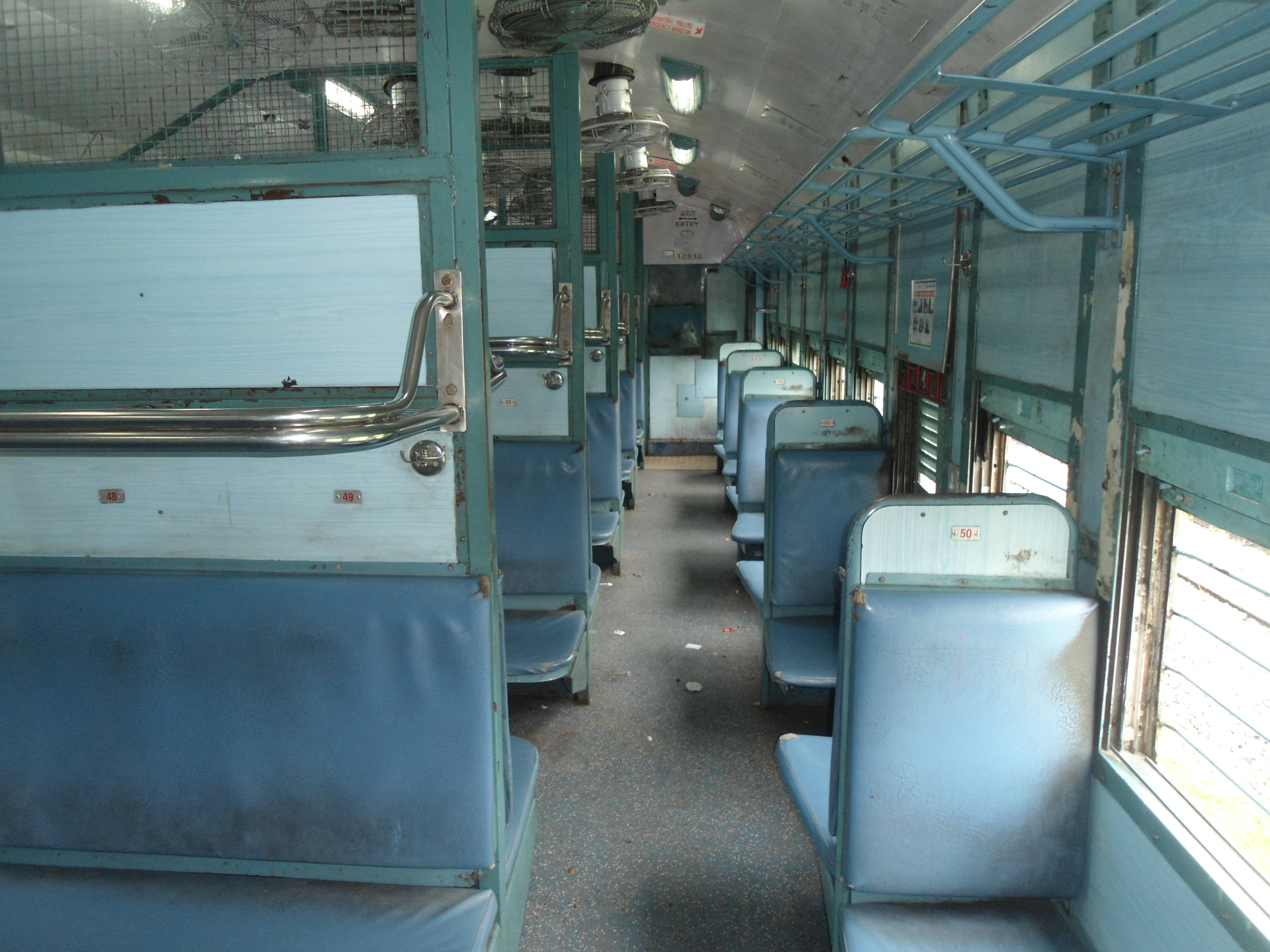
Right side corridor way of inside unreserved passenger train

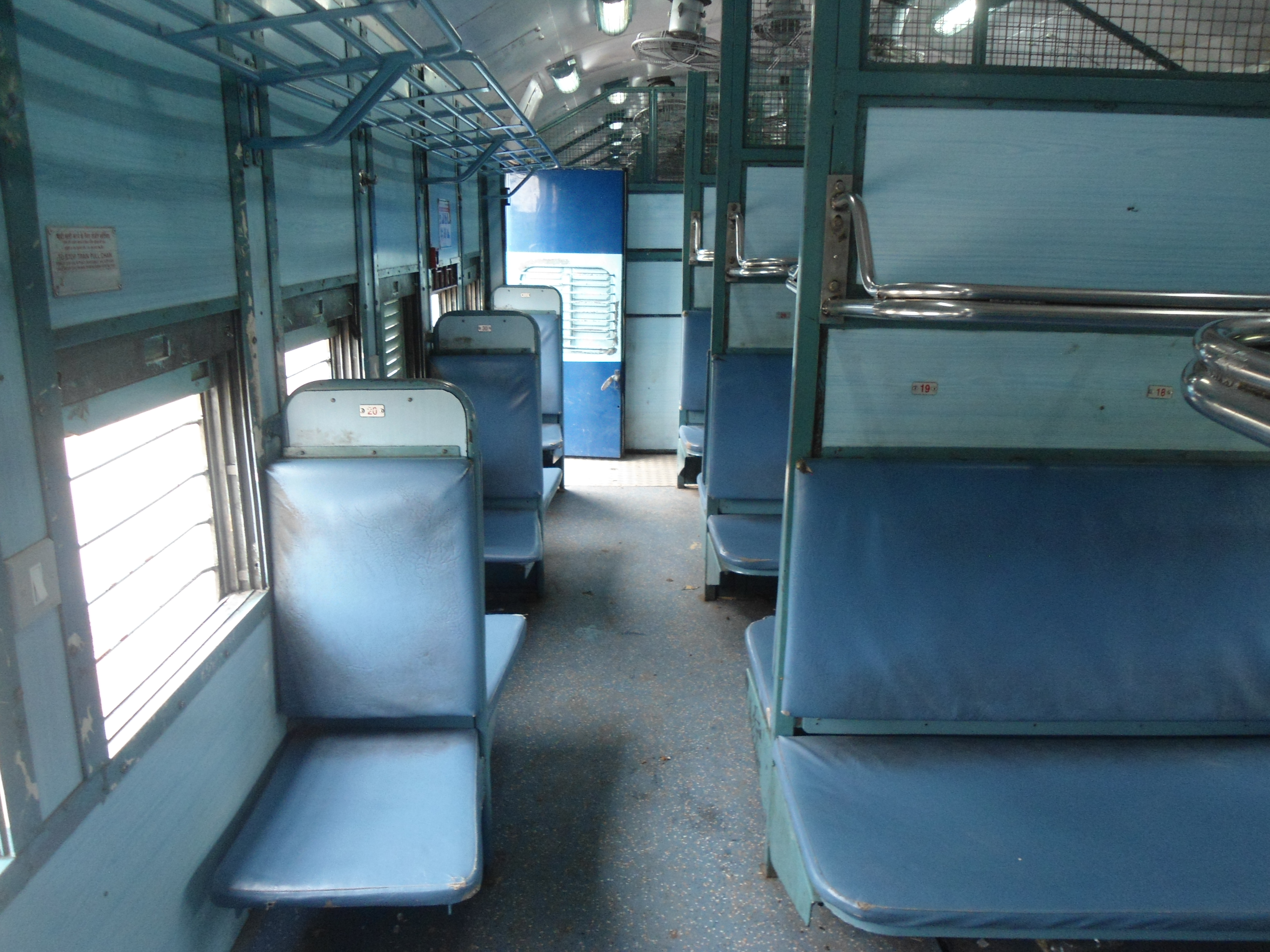
Left side corridor way of inside unreserved passenger train

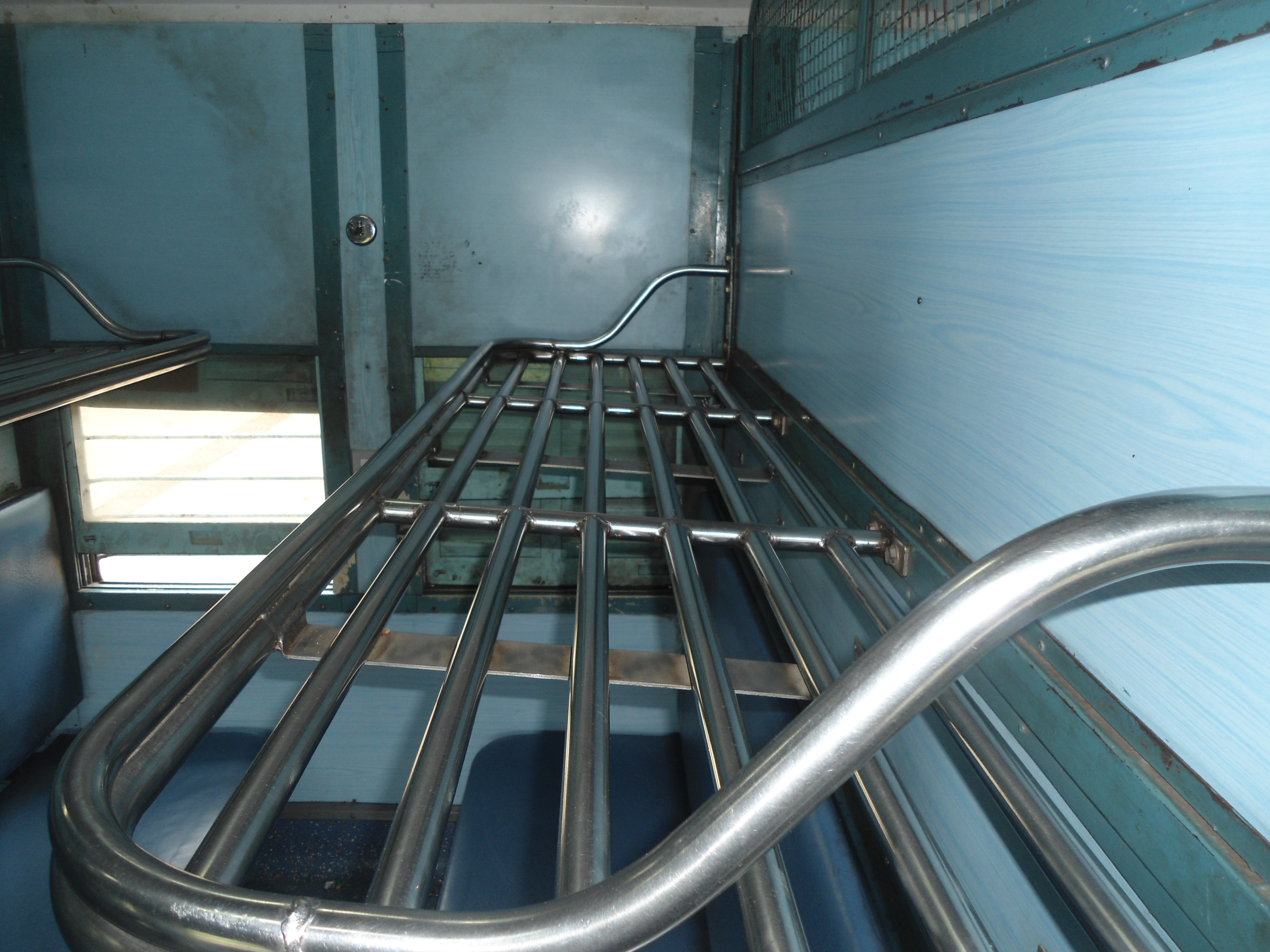
Upper Rack of inside unreserved passenger train

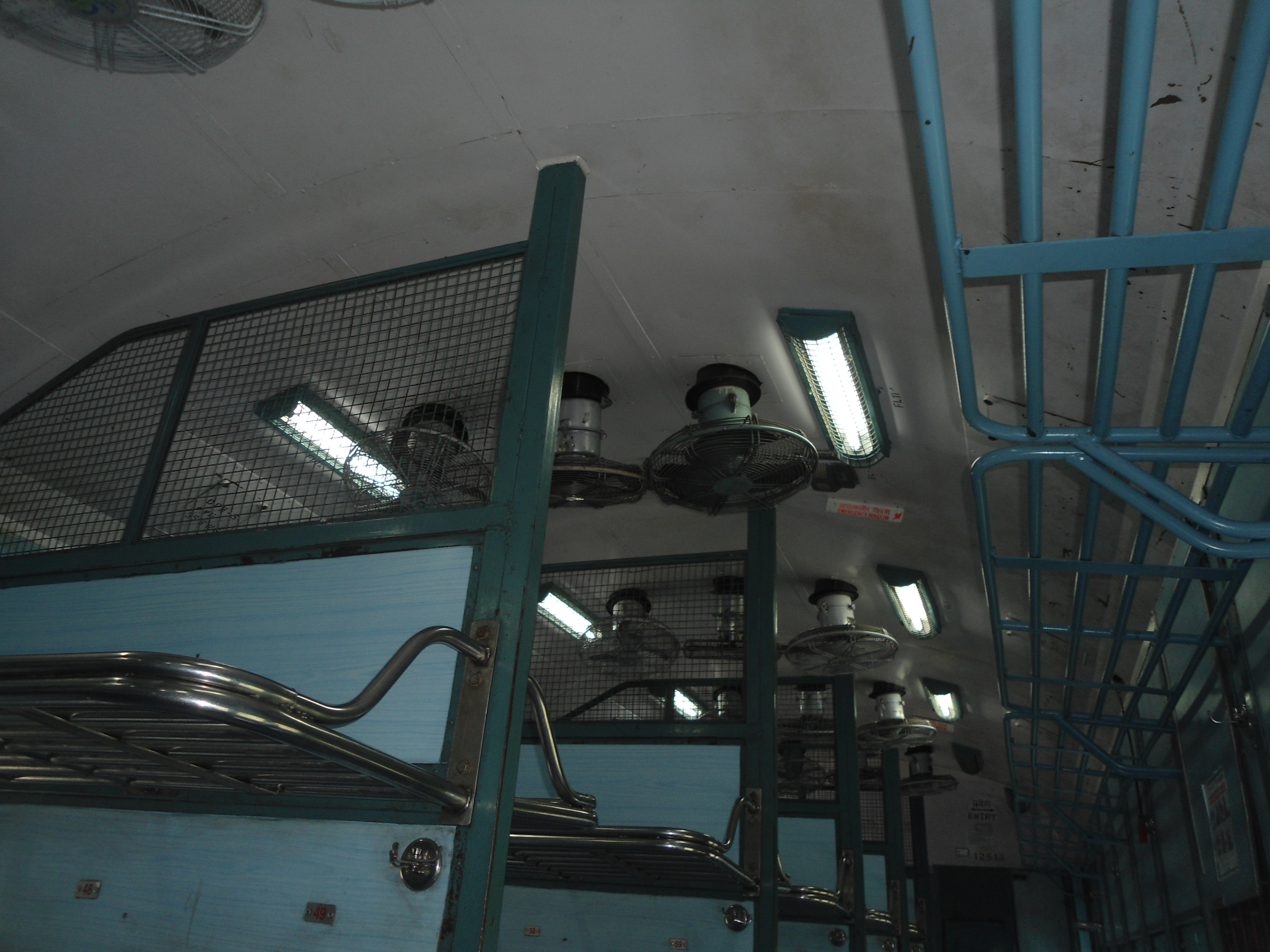
Lights and fans of inside unreserved passenger train

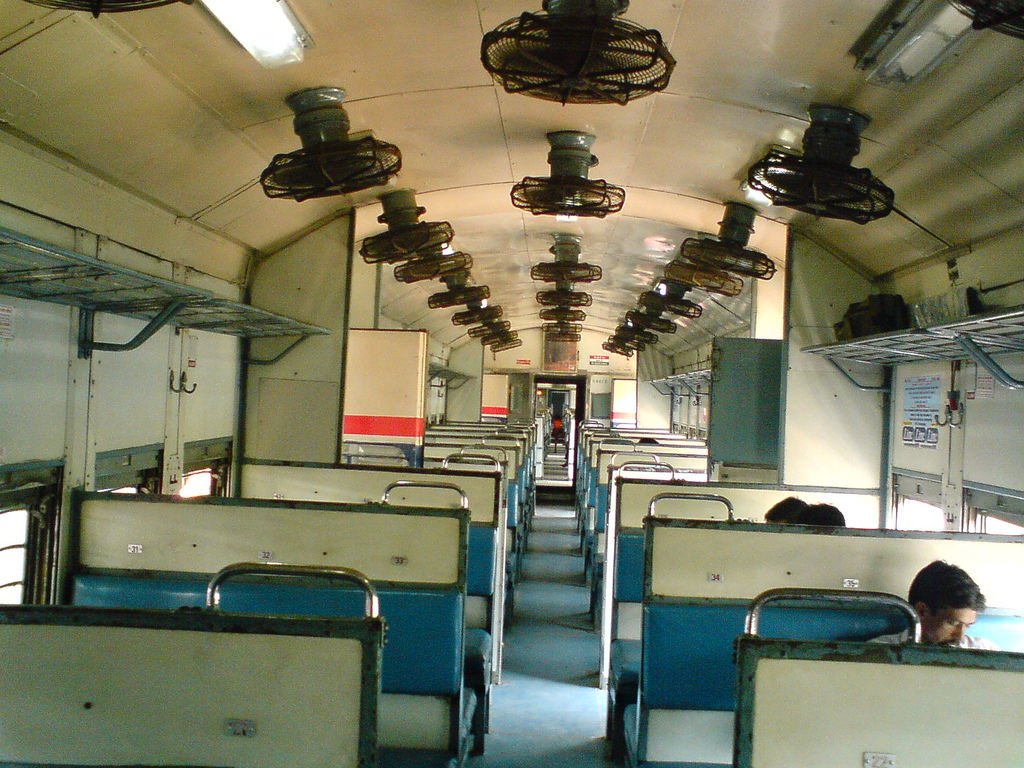
Seating unreserved coach of inside unreserved passenger train

== See also ==
- High-speed rail in India
- Express trains in India
- MEMU
- Suburban trains
