= Farrukhnagar =

- Town
- Location in Haryana, India Farrukhnagar (India)
- Coordinates: 28°26′52″N 76°49′29″E
- Country: India
- State: Haryana
- District: Gurugram
- Named for: Farrukhsiyar
- Elevation: 223 m (732 ft)

Population (2011)
  - Total: 14,848

Languages
  - Official: Hindi
  - Spoken: Haryanvi
- Time zone: UTC+5:30 (IST)
- PIN: 122506
- ISO 3166 code: IN-HR
- Vehicle registration: HR-24
- Website: haryana.gov.in

Farrukhnagar is a small town and municipality in Farrukhnagar tehsil of Gurugram district in the Indian state of Haryana. It is situated 21 kilometres (13 mi) from Gurgaon and shares its border with Jhajjar district.

It was established in 1732 by Faujdar Khan, the first Nawab of Farrukhnagar and a governor of the Mughal Emperor Farrukhsiyar. Farrukhnagar flourished due to its salt trade until the late 19th century, and was abandoned in the early 20th century, during the British Raj. Today monuments such as Sheesh Mahal, Baoli and Jama Masjid built by Faujdar Khan are popular visitor attractions. The town is connected to Garhi Harsaru, south of Gurugram, by the railway line. The Sultanpur National Park is situated in Farrukhnagar tehsil on the road to Gurgaon. Pataudi Palace, 12 kilometres (7.5 mi) from the town, is the nearest palace.

== History ==
=== Mughal era ===
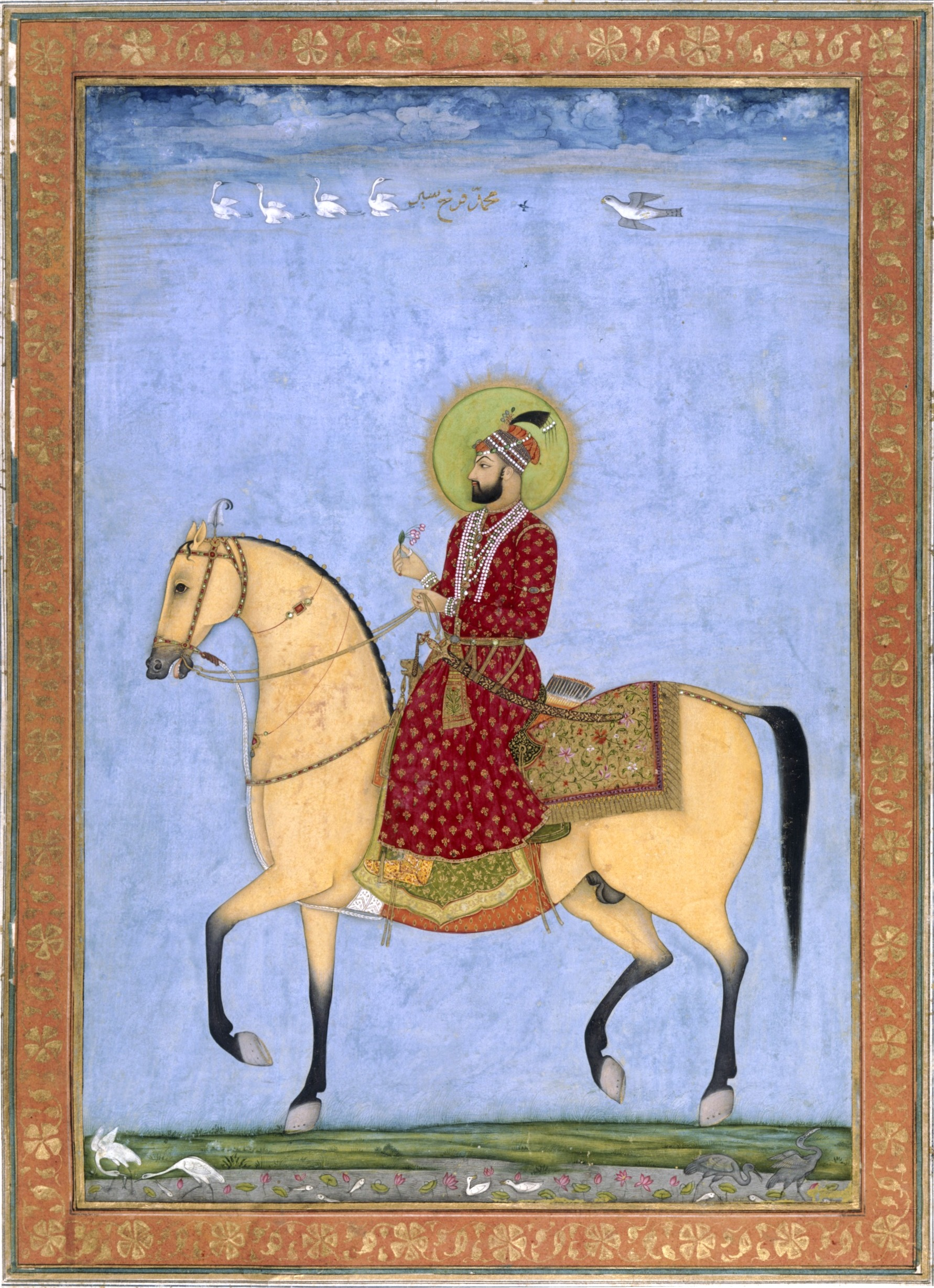
Mughal Emperor Farrukhsiyar (r. 1713–1719) after whom the Farrukhnagar was named, by his governor Faujdar Khan who founded the city in 1732.

Farrukhnagar Fort was built in 1732 by a Baloch named Faujdar Khan, the first Nawab of Farrukhnagar and a governor of the Mughal Emperor Farrukhsiyar and Muhammad Shah Rangeela. Farrukhnagar flourished due to its salt trade. Khan built the fort surrounding the octagonal town, with five gated entrances, his palace known as Sheesh Mahal, a notable structure in Mughal architecture around 1761, also the Jama Masjid and Dilli Darwaza (Delhi Gate). The successive Nawabs ruled over a large tract of land in the area, for over 70 years until they were overthrown by the Jat ruler of Bharatpur. As of 2021, the fort lies in a ruined state.

Baoli Ghaus Ali Shah from this era still exists.

=== British Raj ===
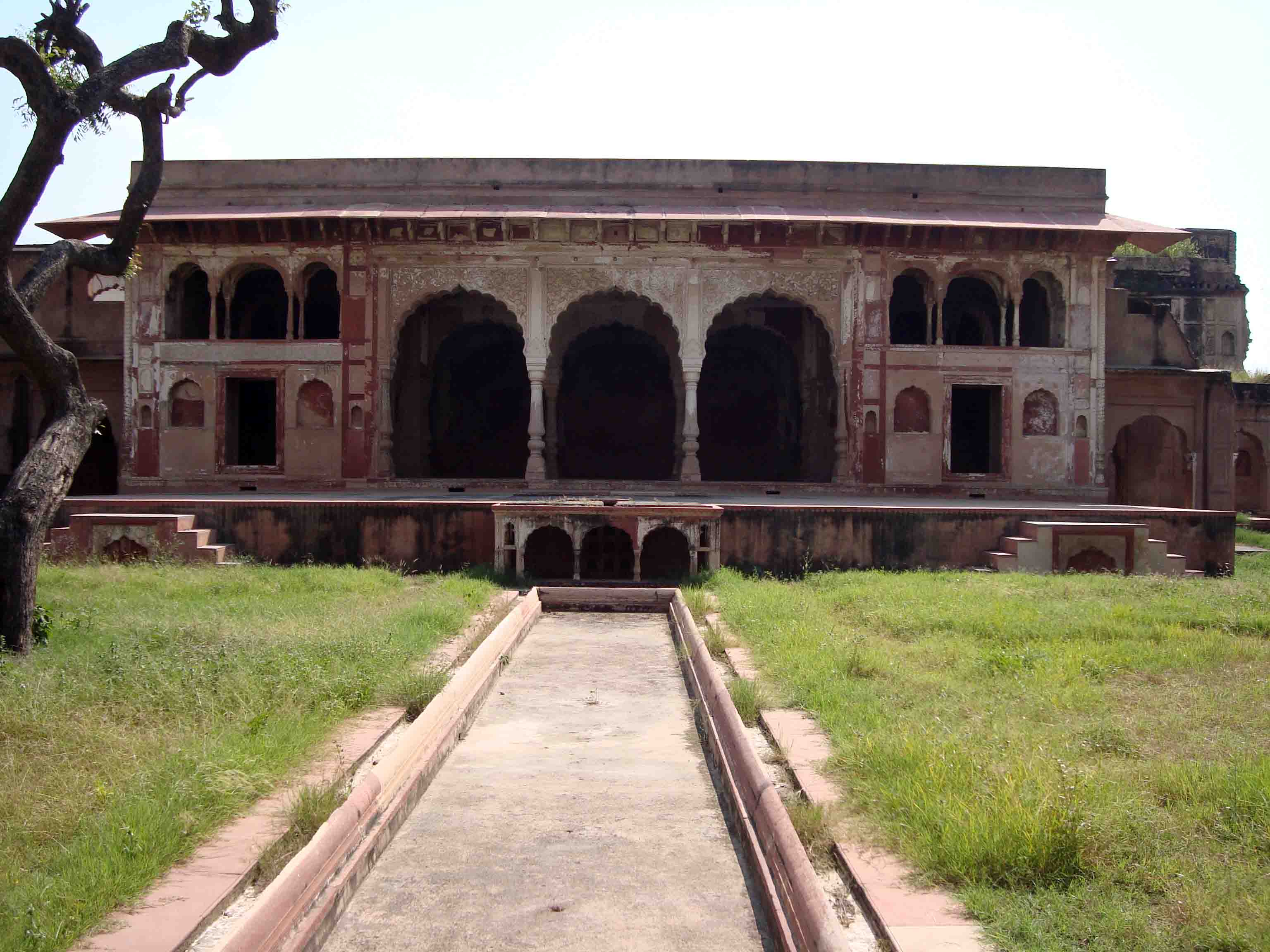
Sheesh Mahal.

Upon annexation by the British Raj, the principality remained with Nawabs, but after Nawab Ahmed Ali Khan of Farrukhnagar, took part in the Indian Rebellion of 1857, along with the Nawabs of Jhajjar, Raja Rao Tula Ram of Rewari and Raja Nahar Singh of Ballabgarh, Bhatti chieftains of Hissar and Sirsa, and the Meo tribesmen, their jagir was confiscated in 1858 and made part of the Empire. During the rebellion their combined forces took over Rohtak completely from British forces for a while, and attacked and plundered the civil station, burning all official records. After the Rebellion failed, forces of Punjab levies moved in and Raja Nahar Singh of Ballabgarh and Nawab Abdur Rehman Khan of Jhajjar were captured and tried, while the former was executed in Delhi, the latter escaped with a sentence of exile to Lahore. A memorial was recently raised to commemorate the martyrs of the rebellion in the city.

For their participation in 1857 rebellion, three main chiefs of Haryana were tried and hanged at Kotwali in Chandani Chowk of Old Delhi. Nahar Singh, the Raja of Ballabhgarh, was hanged on 9 January 1858. Abdur Rehman, Nawab of Jhajjar, was hanged on 23 January 1858. Ahmad Ali, Nawab of Farrukhnagar, was hanged on 23 January 1858. The Chaudharys and Lambardars of villages who participated in rebellion were also deprived of their land and property, including 368 people of Hisar and Gurugram were hanged or transported for life, and fine was imposed on the people of Thanesar (Rs 2,35,000), Ambala (Rs. 25, 3541) and Rohtak (Rs. 63,000 mostly on Ranghars, Shaikhs and Muslim Kasai).

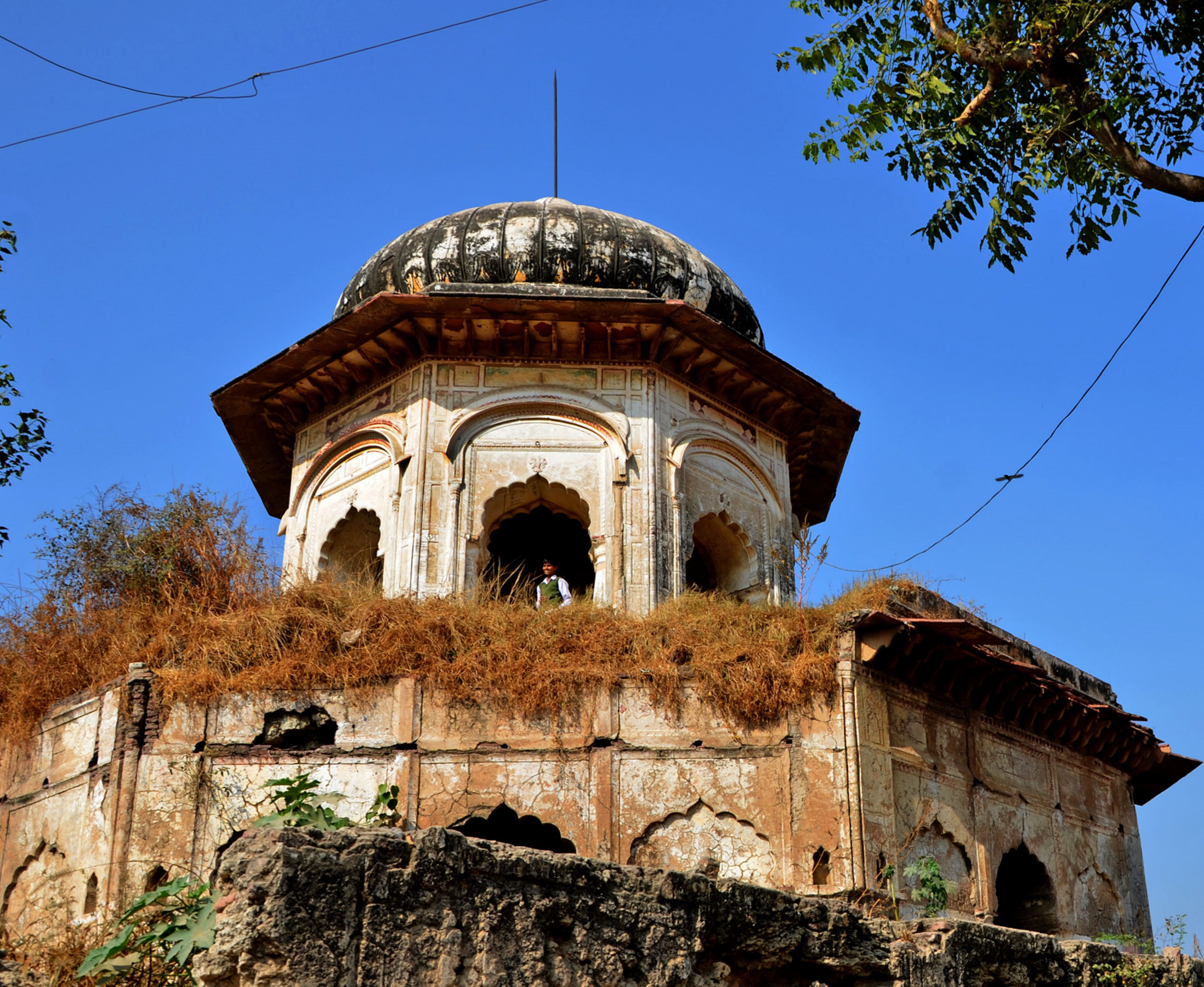
Sethani ki Chhatri at Farrukhnagar.

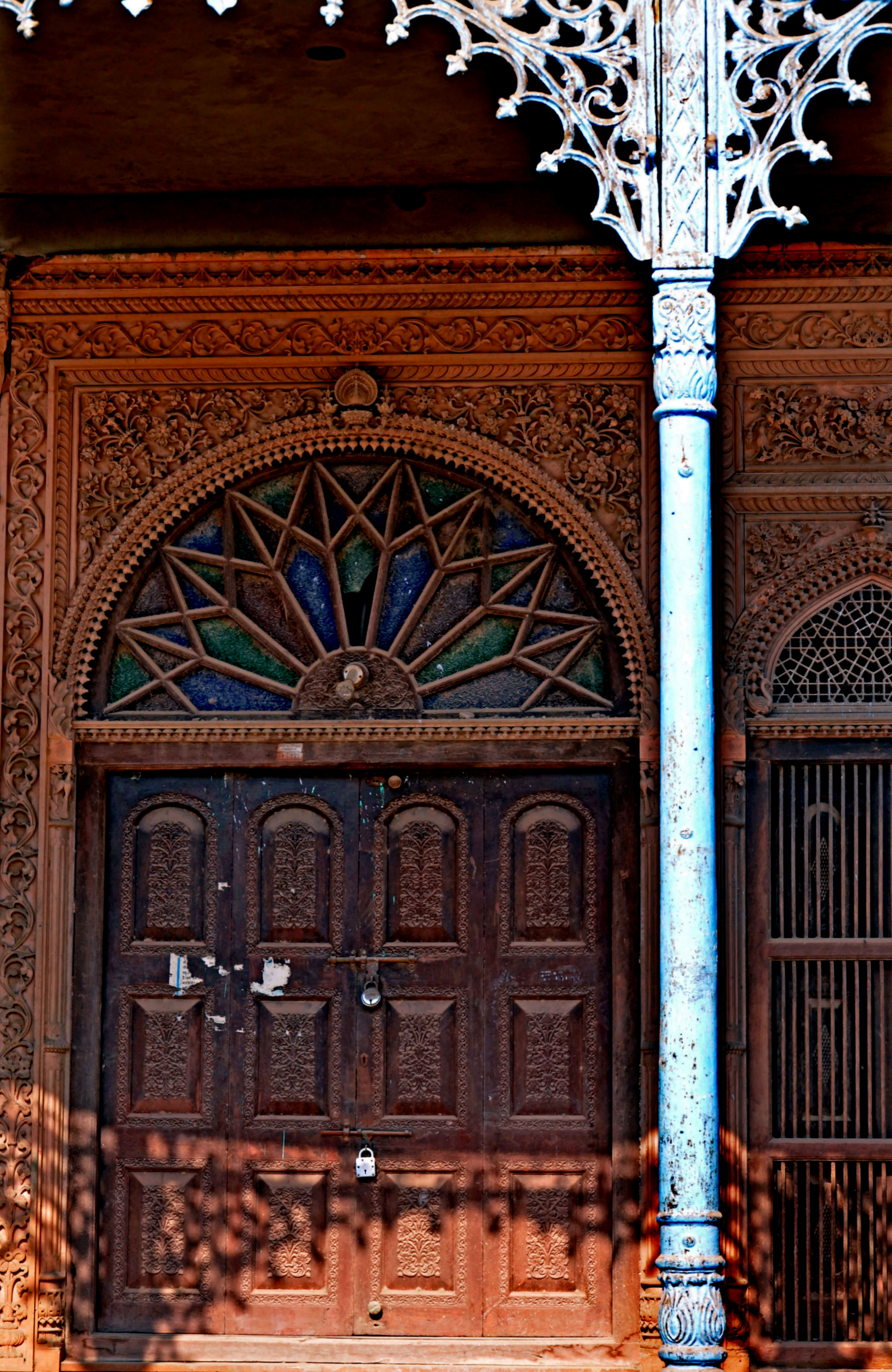
One of the many old havelis in Farrukhnagar, reminder of the days it flourished with salt mines.

== Demography ==
The population of Farrukhnagar municipality and town was 13,513 in As of 2011 census. The population of the entire Farrukhnagar tehsil was 113,493 in As of 2011 census.

Religion in Farrukhnagar City
Religion	Population (1911)	Percentage (1911)
Hinduism	1,671	52.91%
Islam	1,364	43.19%
Christianity	52	1.65%
Sikhism	21	0.66%
Others (Note: Including Jainism, Buddhism, Zoroastrianism, Judaism, others, or not stated)	50	1.58%
Total Population	3,158	100%

== Economy ==
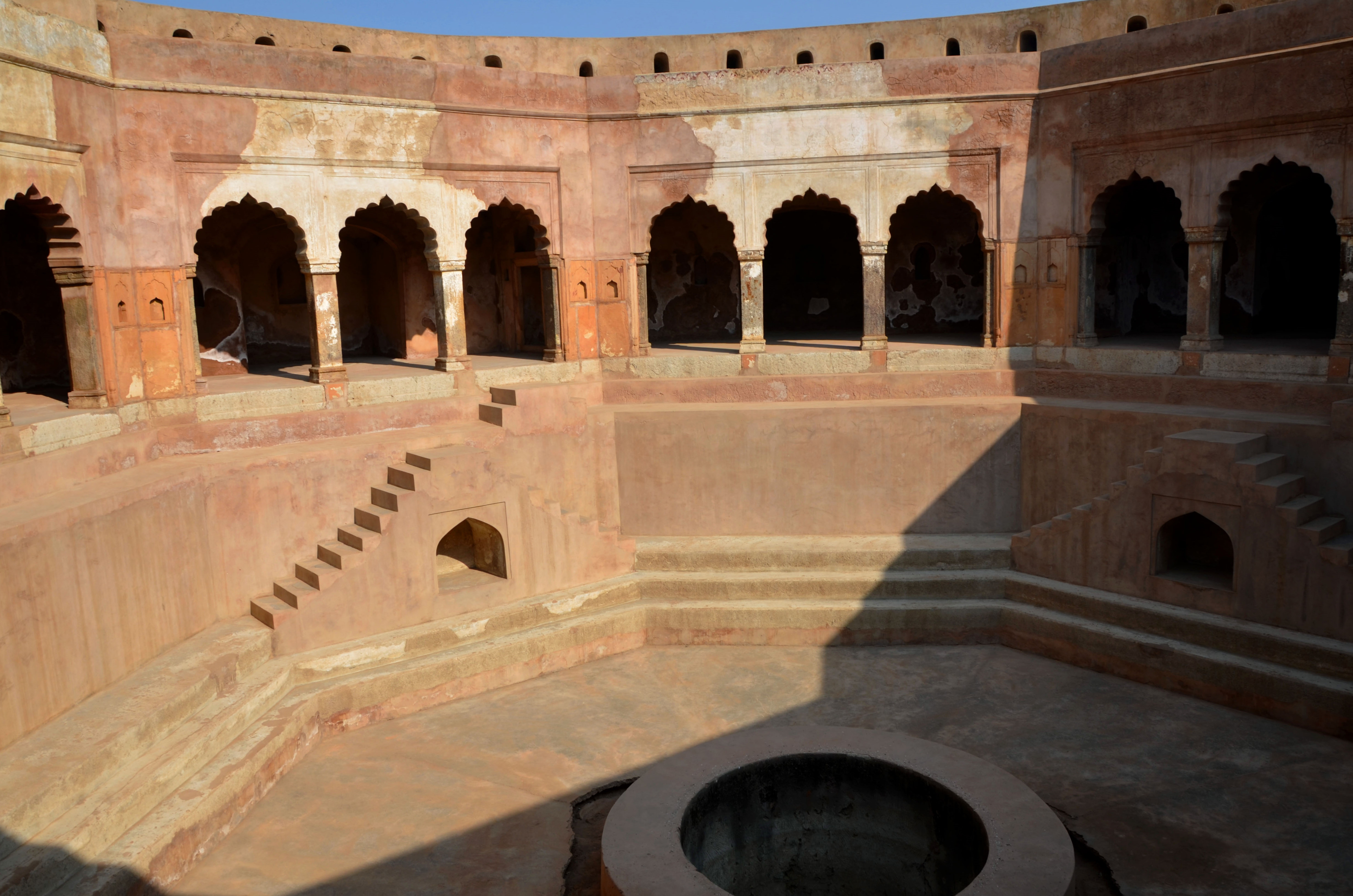
The restored Baoli Ghaus Ali Shah, a stepwell in Farrukhnagar.

The town was once an important trading center for salt manufactured from saline water obtained from wells of 12 village estates located near the town. This salt was called Sultanpur Salt after the location of the most important salt-works of the region.

Sultanpur was the centre of salt production for use in Delhi and the United Provinces until the late 19th century, exporting annually 680,000 maunds or 18,350 tons (1 maund = 37 kg approx.) over the Rajputana-Malwa Railway. Salt was produced by extracting brine from about 40 wells using bullocks and drying in open plots. As salt was one of the major sources of government's revenue, the office of the Salt Superintendent at Sultanpur supervised the levy of Rs.2 per maund (about 37 kg). With the levy of the heavy salt tax and acquisition of the Sambhar salt works in Rajputana (present Rajasthan) by the government, the Sultanpur salt became uneconomical and by 1903-04 the salt industry was struggling for survival with salt export having fallen to 65,000 maunds or 1,750 tons leading to severe setback to the economy of Sultanpur area. Finally, in 1923 the British shut down the office of the salt superintendent at Sultanpur, had all the mounds of salt thrown back into the wells and shut down the salt industry leading to considerable economic misery to the people.

== Education ==
=== Colleges ===
- World College of Technology & Management (WCTM Gurgaon), Farrukhnagar, Gurugram
- Global Institute of Technology & Management, Gurgaon (GITM Farrukhnagar)
- Dronacharya College of Engineering, Gurgaon(DCE)

== Post independence ==
Farrukhnagar became a municipality in 1967. Efforts to revive the salt mining by the government failed, after a massive flood in 1978 brought down the saline level in the wells.

The area saw steep rise in land prices starting from the 1990s onwards due to rapid urbanisation and industrialisation in the Gurgaon district, as a result small section large landowners amassed great wealth in short period, which also encouraged public splurging. For example, an acre of farm land in Farrukhnagar fetched nearly 1 crore rupees (about $250,000) in Dec 2007. In 2007, the town made news in the global media, when a local jat farmer hired a private helicopter to ferry his son to his wedding, barely 20 km away. In the recent years, heritage structures in the town have attracted interest from various organisations including ASI and INTACH, which is proposing a "heritage walk" around town, and also plans to develop it as a heritage village.

== Visitor attractions ==
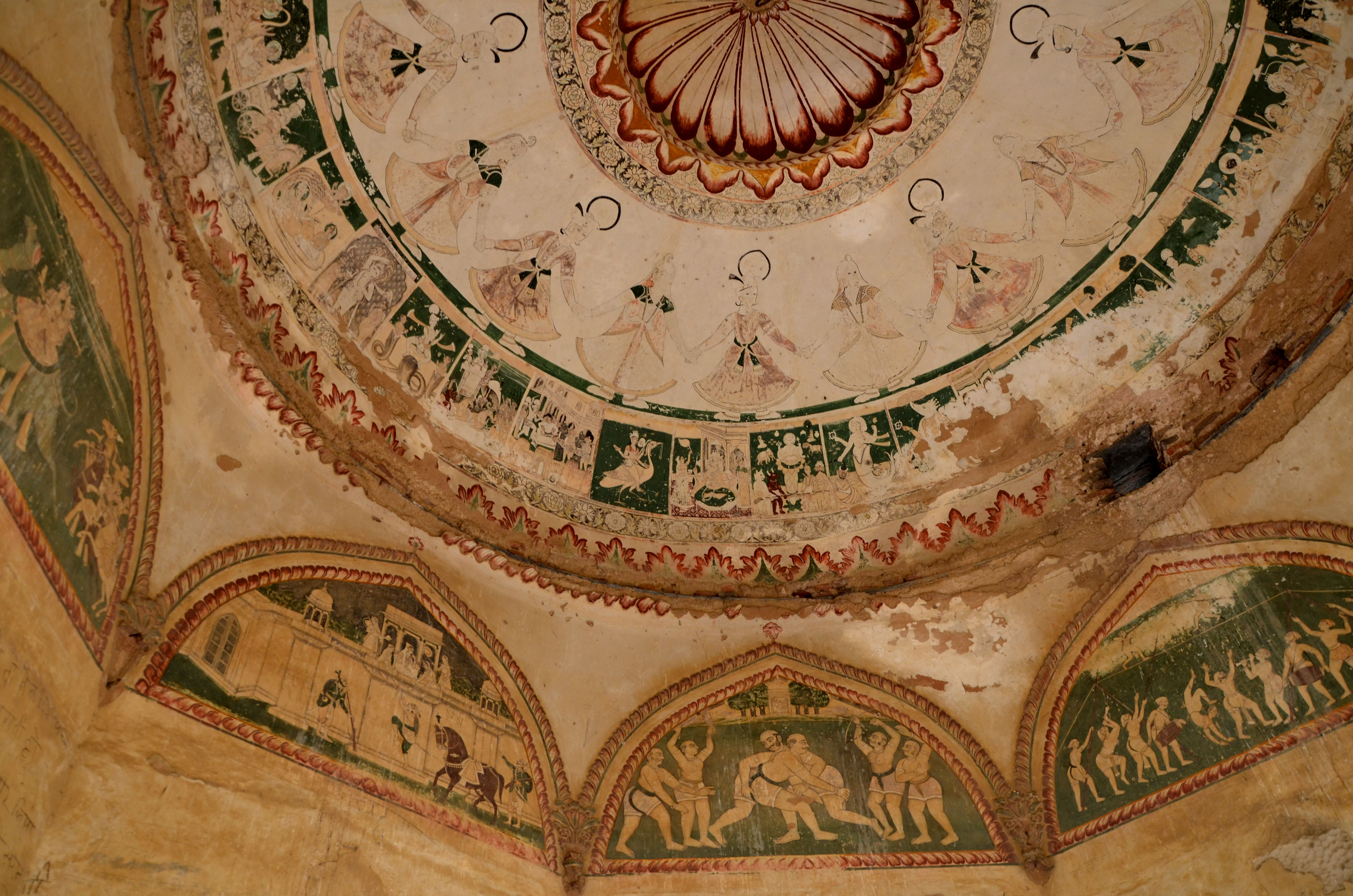
Frescoed ceiling of Sethani ki Chhatri, Farrukhnagar.

Sheesh Mahal, and Jama Masjid have noted Mughal era monuments situated in the town both built by the first Nawab, Faujdar Khan are important visitors attractions.

- Farrukhnagar Fort: Dilli Darwaza (Delhi Gate), with its impressive bastion, is an important feature of the fort, it is one of three surviving entrances to the town, out of earlier five gated entrances which have slowly been built into by the growing town. The Dilli Darwaza was restored in 2009 by INTACH, along with the Patli Darwaza (after nearby Patli) and the Jhajjari Darwaza, (after nearby Jhajjar town). The rest of the fort though now mostly in ruins once housed over 4,000 people. The town plan was designed octagonal in shape.
- Jama Masjid: This congregation mosque was also built by Faujdar Khan, in red sandstone. Two slabs of red sandstone on the southern wall bear Arabic inscriptions dating to the period of Sultan of Delhi, Ghiyas ud din Balban (1200–1287). The slabs are stated to have been brought from an ancient mosque in Sultanpur about 5 km away in the direction of Delhi.
- Sheesh Mahal: The palace of the Nawab of Farrukhnagar aligns the main bazaar of the town as do many other heritage structures in the town. Built by Faujdar Khan in 1711 CE, it is a double-storey structure in red sandstone, Mughal bricks and Jhajjar stone, used commonly in the buildings of the period in the district. It has decorative interiors of elaborate mirror inlay work, hence its name, Sheesh Mahal (Glass Palace). It's baradari, literally a pavilion with 12 doorways, now houses Municipal committee office, once housed a school. The palace opens on to a large courtyard with water channel in the centre, it was fed by a nearby baoli or stepwell, it is also believed that in olden days, the queen used to visit the baoli for taking bath from Sheesh Mahal through a tunnel, which has since been closed. The palace is being restored by the archaeological department and its premises also has a memorial dedicated to the martyrs of Indian Rebellion of 1857 from the town. In 2025, Haryana government announced a INR 95 crore restoration plan for upgrade of 20 monuments across the state including the Sheesh Mahal.
- Sethani Ki Chhatri: An elaborate memorial cenotaph in the shape of a two-storeyed chhatri, which is a pillar pavilion is situated on the Jhajjar road at the entrance to the town. It has eight arched openings on each floor and floral decorative motifs are used profusely. Chhatri though typical to Rajasthani architecture, it was later adapted into Mughal architecture. The name suggests that it belonged to a merchants wife, and is decorated with inscriptions and frescoes from Haroti region in Rajasthan. An inscription within the ceiling frescoes dates it to Vikram Samvat 1918, i.e. 1861 AD.
- Sita-Ram Mandir: Originally built as a mosque, it was captured and turned into a temple during the riots after the Partition of India and also serves the purpose of Gurdwara.
- Havelis: A set of old havelis in the main town are in good condition, and boast of frescoes, and post-Mughal architectural features.
- Shrine of Budho Mata: The nearby village Mubarakpur 5 km from Farrukhnagar, is famous for this shrine, where a fair is held every Wednesday.
- Baoli Ghaus Ali Shah: A 3-story large octagonal Baoli stepwell, also known as Ali Gosh Khan Baoli, with stone staircases is considered a monument of importance and has been restored after it was taken over by ASI. It has been renovated.

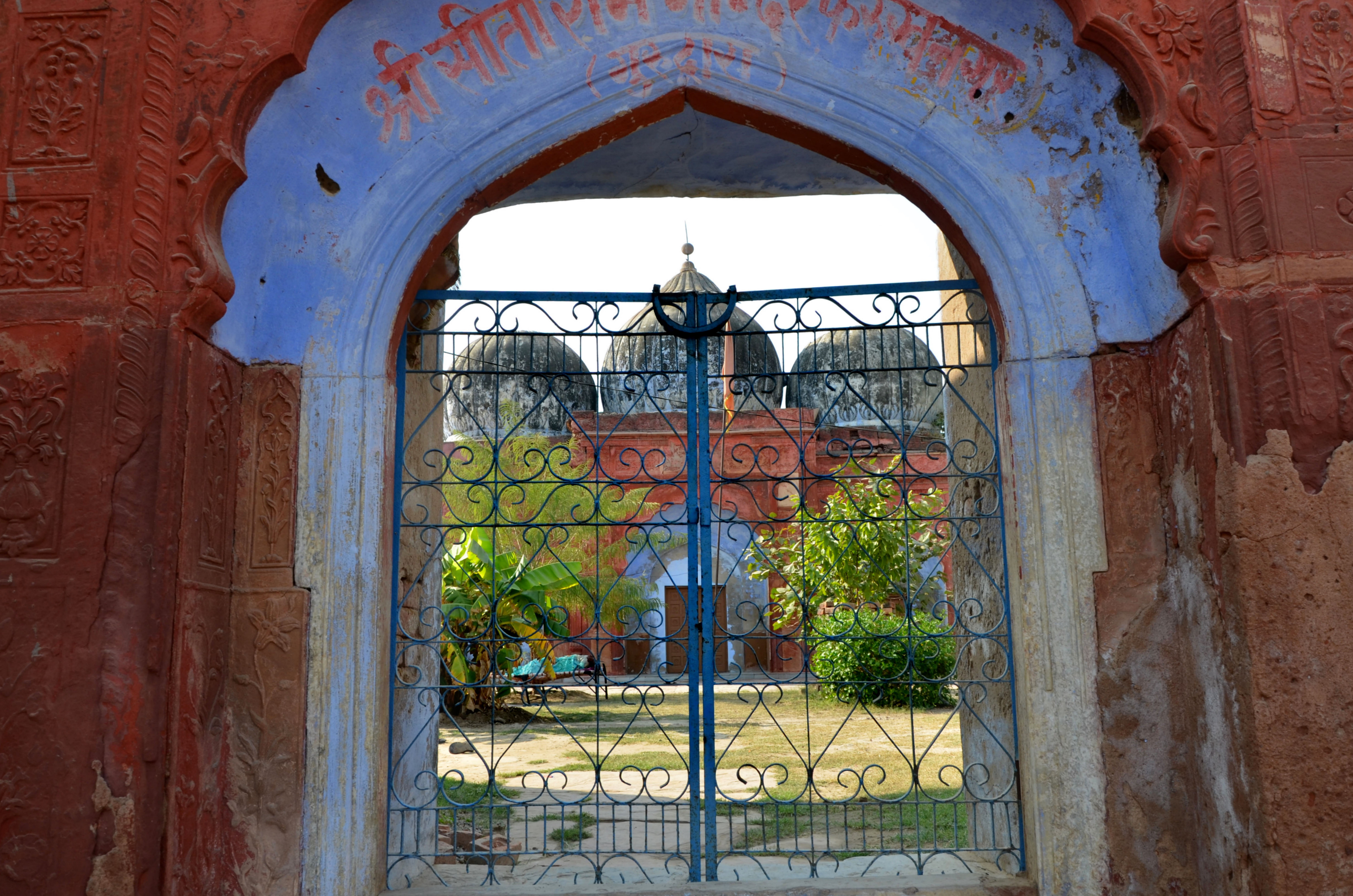
Sitaram Mandir-Gurdwara, Farrukhnagar (previously a mosque built during the Mughal Empire)

- Farrukhnagar railway station: Built during the British Raj it was opened when the first meter gauge railway track in India, was opened between Delhi to Rewari (84 km) on 14 February 1873, along with a branch line from Garhi Harsaru to Farukhnagar (12 km) specifically for the salt trading. The metre gauge railway line was closed in 1994 for gauge conversion, and reopened as broad gauge track in 2011.
- Sultanpur National Park: The Sultanpur National Park is also situated close by on the road to Gurgaon, and is a haunt for many migratory birds during the winter months.

== Transport ==
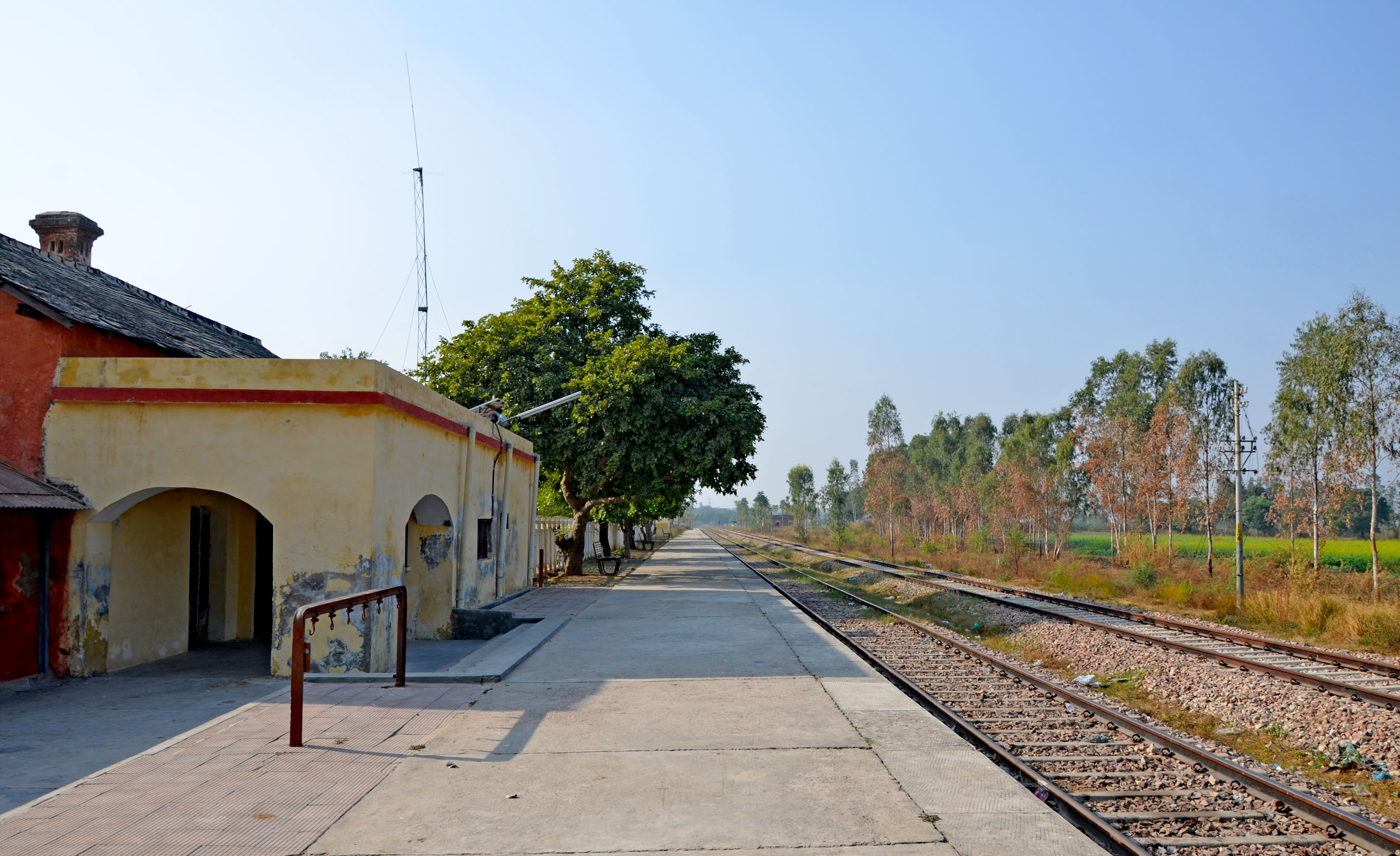
Farrukhnagar Railway Station

Farrukhnagar is connected to Gurgaon (16 km.), Jhajjar, Pataudi and other towns by road. Kundli-Manesar-Palwal Expressway (KMP Expressway) lies close to the town.

A branch line was laid in 1901 to Garhi Harsaru Junction railway station on Rajputana-Malwa Railway (Delhi-Ajmer railway), 12 km away. From Farrukhnagar railway station, the metre gauge train used to transport salt by steam engines. It was closed in 2004 for gauge conversion. The converted broad gauge track became operational in 2011. There has been a proposal to extend the track to Jhajjar where it will join Rewari-Jhajjar-Rohtak railway line.

== See also ==
- Haryana Tourism
- Principality of Farrukhnagar
- List of Monuments of National Importance in Haryana
- List of State Protected Monuments in Haryana
- List of Indus Valley Civilization sites in Haryana
- List of National Parks & Wildlife Sanctuaries of Haryana, India
