= Sri Sathya Sai Prasanthi Nilayam railway station =

Railway station in Andhra Pradesh, India

Sri Sathya Sai Prasanthi Nilayam శ్రీ సత్య సాయి ప్రశాంతి నిలయం
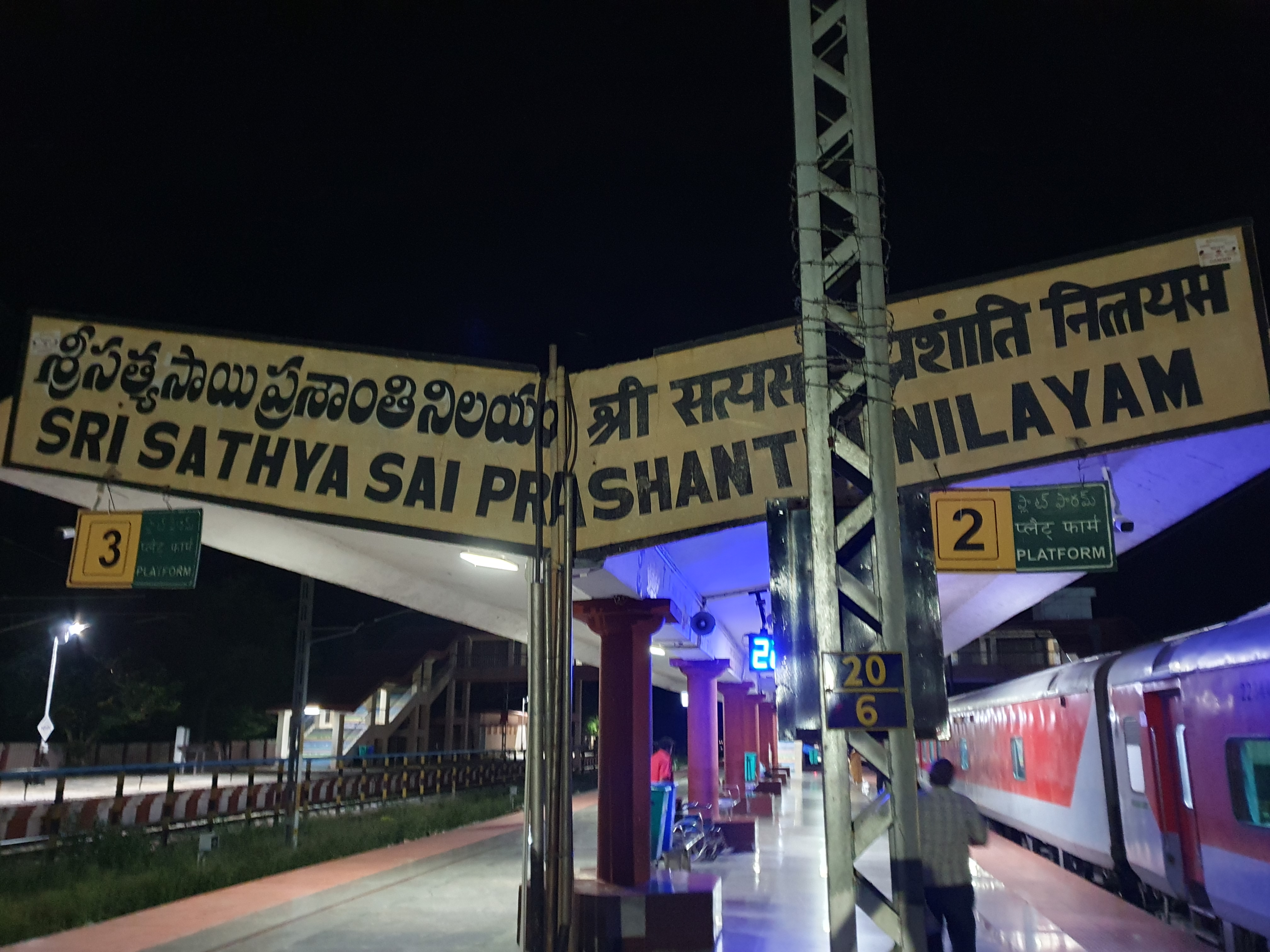
- Sri Sathya Sai Prasanthi Nilayam railway station

General information
- Location: Puttaparthi, Andhra Pradesh, India
- Coordinates: 14.1611°N 77.7590°E
- Elevation: 458 m (1,503 ft)
- Owner: Indian Railways
- Line: Guntakal–Bangalore section

Construction
- Parking: Available

Other information
- Status: Active
- Station code: SSPN
- Fare zone: South Western Railway zone passenger traffic per day 25000

History
- Opened: 23 November 2000; 25 years ago
Location
- Location within Andhra Pradesh Location within India

Sri Sathya Sai Prasanthi Nilayam (station code: SSPN) is a major railway station and is located around 8 km to the west of the pilgrim town of Puttaparthi in Andhra Pradesh, India. Puttaparthi is a renowned pilgrim center and the location of the ashram of Sathya Sai Baba. The station falls under the jurisdiction of Bangalore division of South Western Railways. It has four platforms and is situated on the line connecting Dharmavaram and Penukonda.

== Performance and Earnings ==
The table below shows the passenger earnings of the station previous years.

Passenger Earnings
Year	Earnings (in Lakhs)
2011–12	910.69
2012–13	1013
2013–14	1283
2014–15	1482

Preceding station	Indian Railways	Following station
Kottacheruvu (KTCR) towards ?	South Western Railway zone Guntakal–Bangalore section	Narayanapuram (NRYP) towards ?
