= Farrukhnagar–Saharanpur Janta Express =

Overview
- Service type: Express
- Current operator: Northern Railway zone

Route
- Termini: Farrukhnagar (FN); Saharanpur Junction (SRE)
- Stops: 25
- Distance travelled: 217 km (135 mi)
- Average journey time: 8h 15m
- Service frequency: daily (Note: Runs daily for every direction.)
- Train number: 14545/14546

On-board services
- Class: General Unreserved
- Seating arrangements: Yes
- Sleeping arrangements: no
- Catering facilities: On-board catering
- Observation facilities: ICF coach
- Entertainment facilities: No
- Baggage facilities: No
- Other facilities: Below the seats

Technical
- Rolling stock: 2
- Track gauge: 1,676 mm (5 ft 6 in)
- Operating speed: 26 km/h (16 mph), including halts

The Farrukhnagar–Saharanpur Janta Express is an Express train belonging to Northern Railway zone that runs between Farrukhnagar and Saharanpur Junction in India. It is currently being operated with 14545/14546 train numbers on a daily basis.

== Service ==
The 14545/Farrukhnagar–Saharanpur Janta Express averages a speed of 26 km/h and covers 217 km in 8h 15m. The 14546/Saharanpur–Farrukhnagar Janta Express averages a speed of 33 km/h and covers 217 km in 6h 35m.

== Route and halts ==
The important halts of the train are:

- Farrukhnagar
- Garhi Harsaru Junction
- Gurgaon
- Palam
- Delhi Cantonment
- Patel Nagar
- Delhi Sarai Rohilla
- Delhi Junction
- Delhi Shahdara Junction
- Baghpat Road
- Shamli
- Hind
- Thana Bhawan
- Tapri Junction
- Saharanpur Junction

== Coach composition ==
The train has standard ICF rakes with max speed of 110 kmph. The train consists of 14 coaches:

- 12 General Unreserved
- 2 Seating cum Luggage Rake

== Traction ==
Both trains are hauled by a Tuglakabad Loco Shed-based WDP-1 diesel locomotive from Farrukhnagar to Saharanpur and vice versa.

== See also ==
- Farrukhnagar railway station
- Saharanpur Junction railway station
- Kanpur Central–Bandra Terminus Weekly Express
- Kanpur Central–Amritsar Weekly Express
