= Tapri Junction railway station =

Railway Station in Uttar Pradesh, India

- Indian Railways logo

General information
- Location: Tapri, Saharanpur district, Uttar Pradesh; India
- Coordinates: 29.915635°N 77.583308°E
- Elevation: 272.200 metres (893.04 ft)
- System: Indian Railways station
- Owner: Indian Railways
- Operator: Northern Railway
- Line: Delhi–Meerut–Saharanpur line
- Platforms: 2
- Tracks: 2

Construction
- Structure type: Standard (on-ground station)
- Parking: Yes
- Cycle facilities: No

Other information
- Status: Functioning
- Station code: TPZ
- Zone(s): Northern Railway
- Division(s): Delhi
Location
- Location within India Location within Uttar Pradesh

Tapri Junction railway station is a railway station in Saharanpur district, Uttar Pradesh. Its code is TPZ. It serves Tapri town. The station consists of two platforms. Passenger, Express, and Superfast trains halt here.

== Trains ==
The following trains halt at Tapri Junction railway station in both directions:

- Farrukhnagar–Saharanpur Janta Express
- Dehradun Jan Shatabdi Express
- Udaipur City–Haridwar Express
- Kalinga Utkal Express
- Yoga Express
- Uttaranchal Express
- Lokmanya Tilak Terminus–Haridwar AC Superfast Express

== Gallery ==
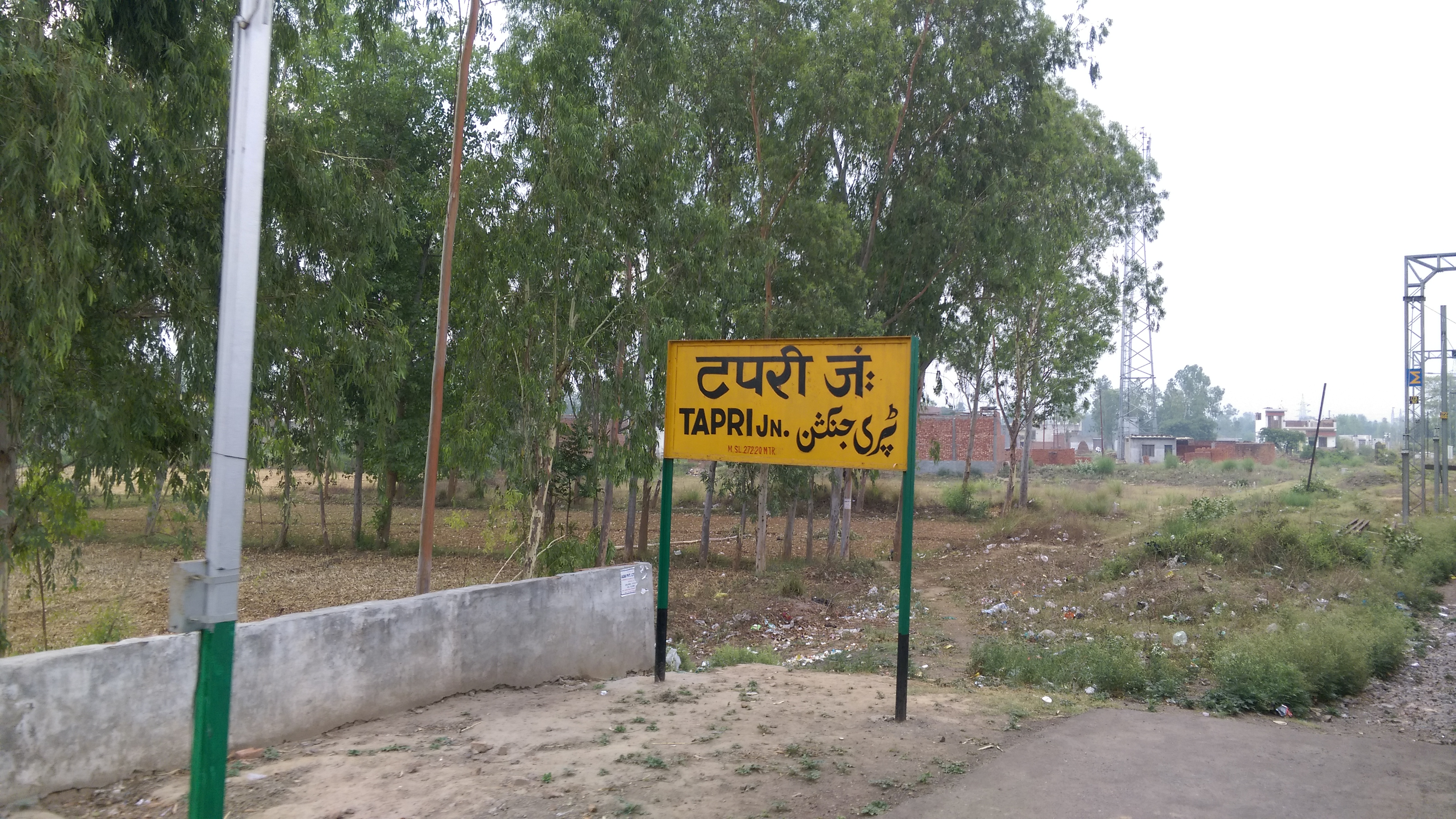
Station board at platform

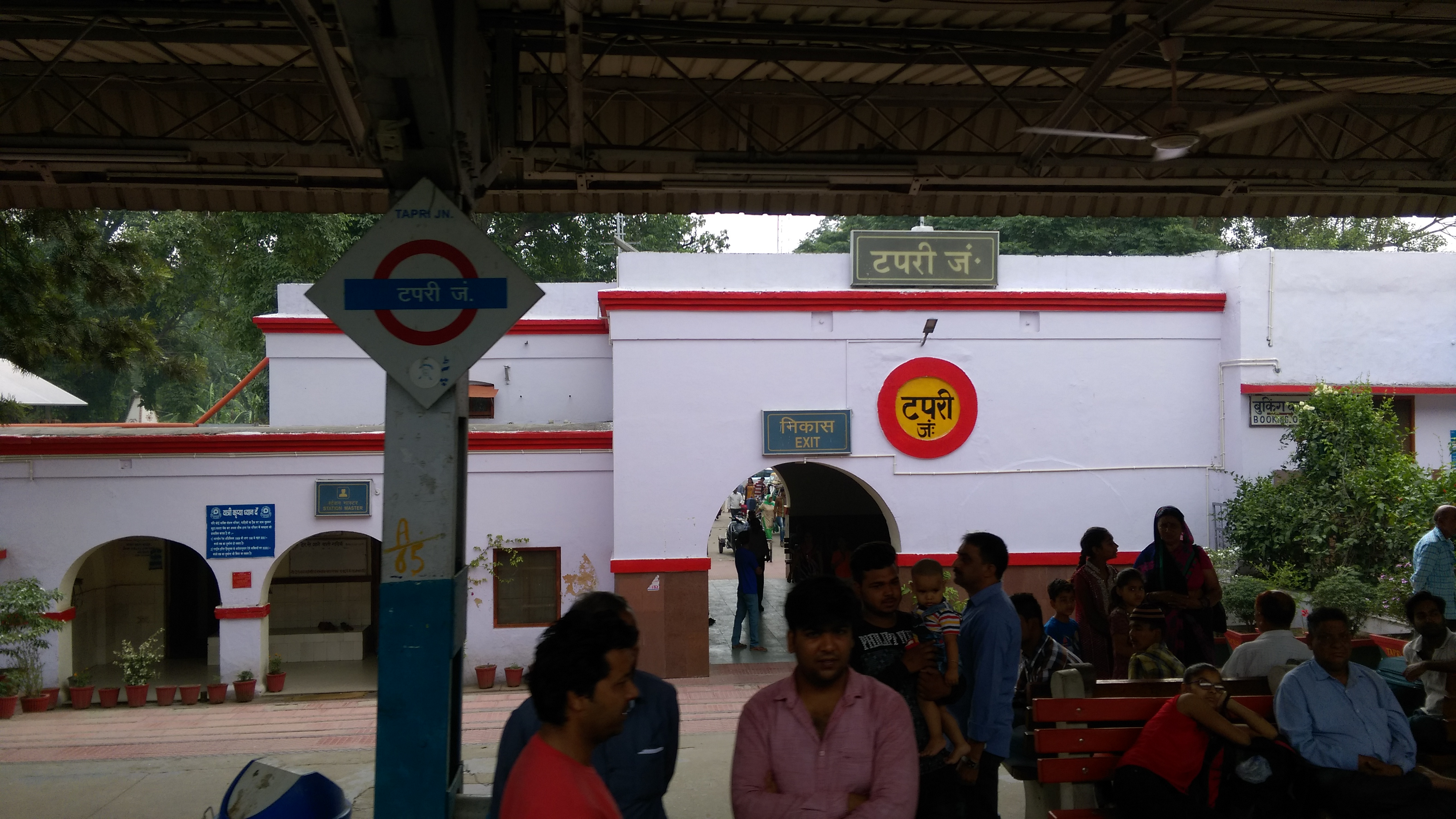
Tapri Junction railway station – Platform

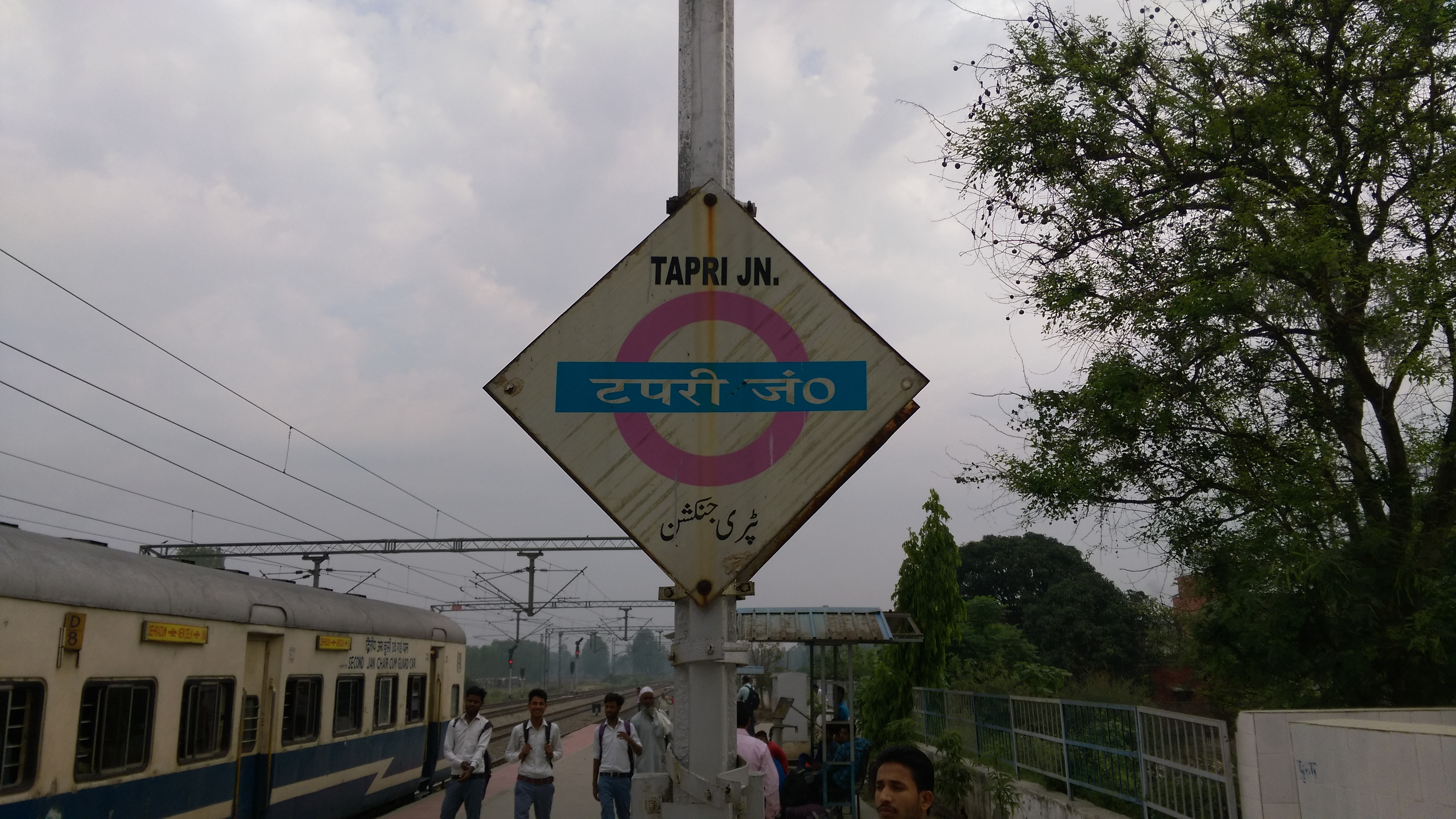
Tapri Junction railway station – Platform board with Dehradun – New Delhi Jan Shatabdi Express
