= Baoli Ghaus Ali Shah =

Stepwell in Farrukhnagar, Haryana, India

Coordinates: 28.4501°N 76.8259°E

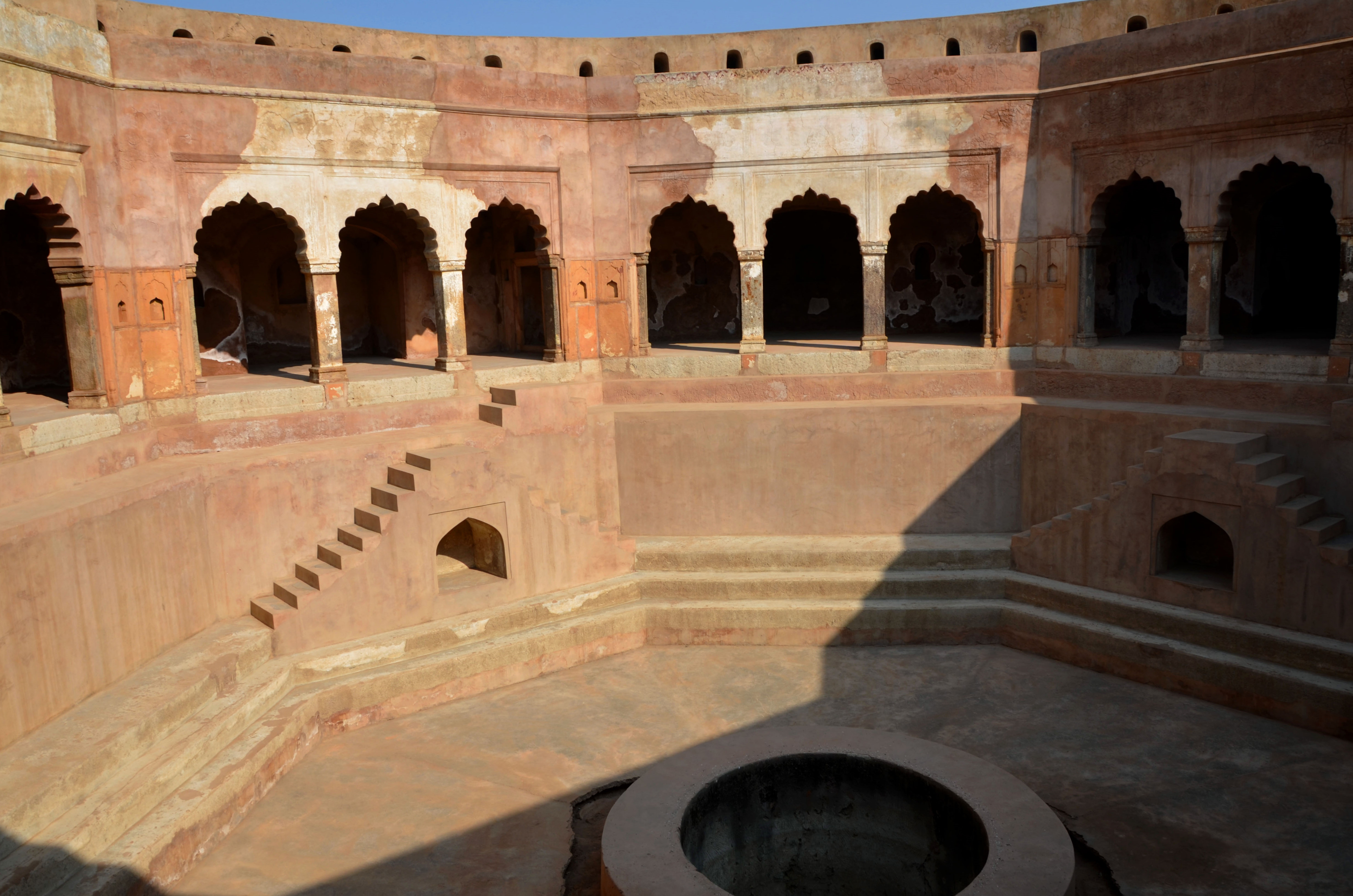
Baoli Ghaus Ali Shah, Jhajjar road, Gurugram

Baoli Ghaus Ali Shah, also known as Ghaus Khan ki Baoli, is an 18th-century stepwell located in Farrukhnagar, Gurugram district, Haryana, India. Constructed during the reign of Mughal Emperor Farrukhsiyar, it was commissioned by Ghaus Ali Shah, a local chief who served under the emperor.

== Architecture ==
The baoli was built to be a high point for surveying the area and also served as a perennial source of fresh water away from the access of the enemy who might poison or spoil it. The central water tank is approximately 6.5 meters deep, with an arched verandah overlooking the inner core and a well wall for a pulley system on one side. The structure also includes chambers on the upper storeys intended for relaxation and recreation. The lower level houses a small central circular well surrounded by 21 colonnades. Built from stone, lime plaster, and bricks, its construction wears some resemblance with the Turkish hammam and reflects the Mughal architectural style prevalent during the 18th century.

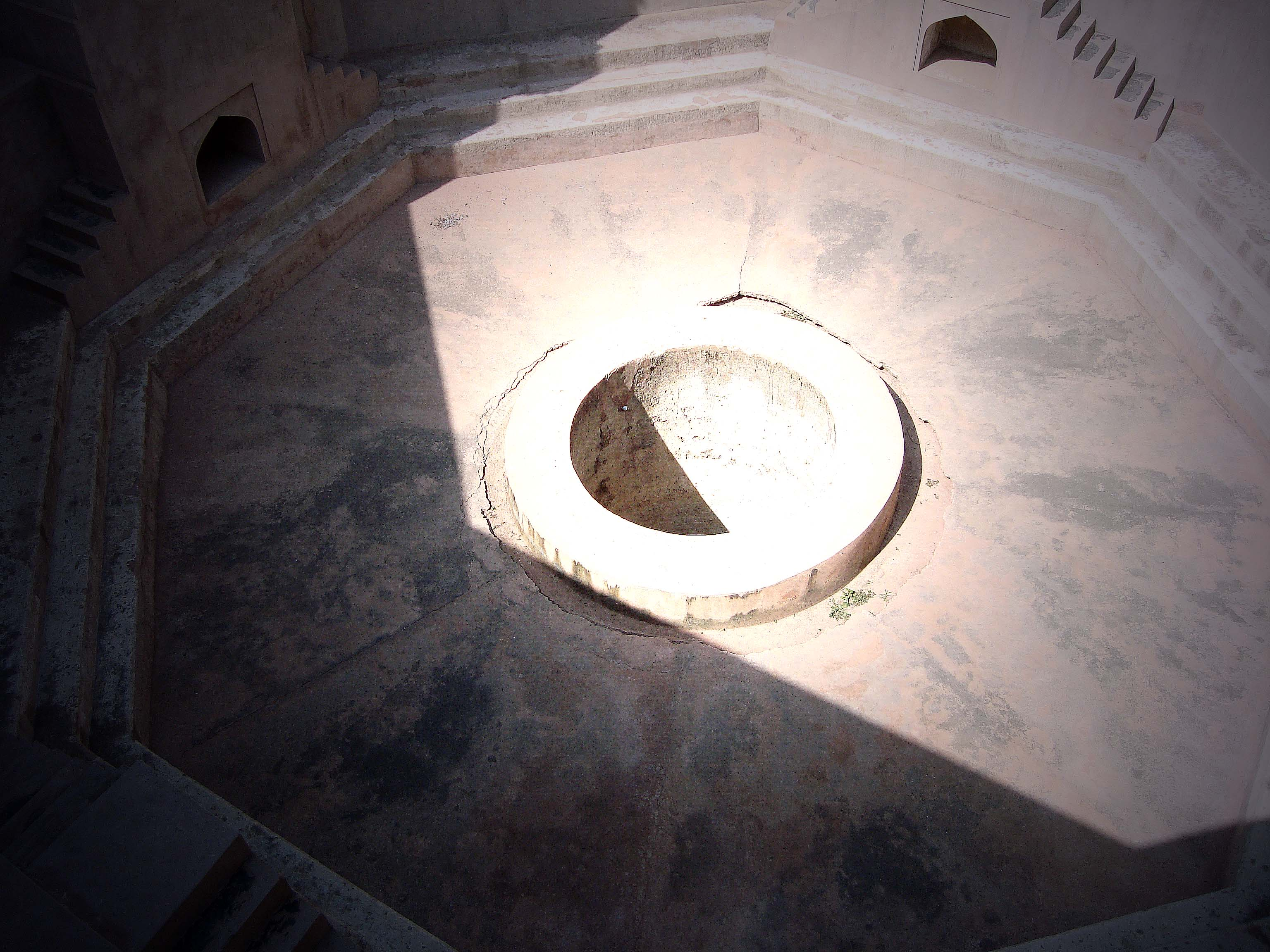
The well-surrounded water tank of Baoli Ghas Ali Shah

== Cultural significance ==
Historically, the baoli was used as a water tank catering to the Sheesh Mahal and may have served as a bathing space for women, as evidenced by hidden passages at both ends.

In recent years, efforts have been made to preserve and protect Baoli Ghaus Ali Shah.

== See also ==
- List of Monuments of National Importance in Haryana
- Stepwells of Haryana.
