= Farrukhnagar railway station =

Railway station in Haryana, India

Farrukhnagar Railway Station
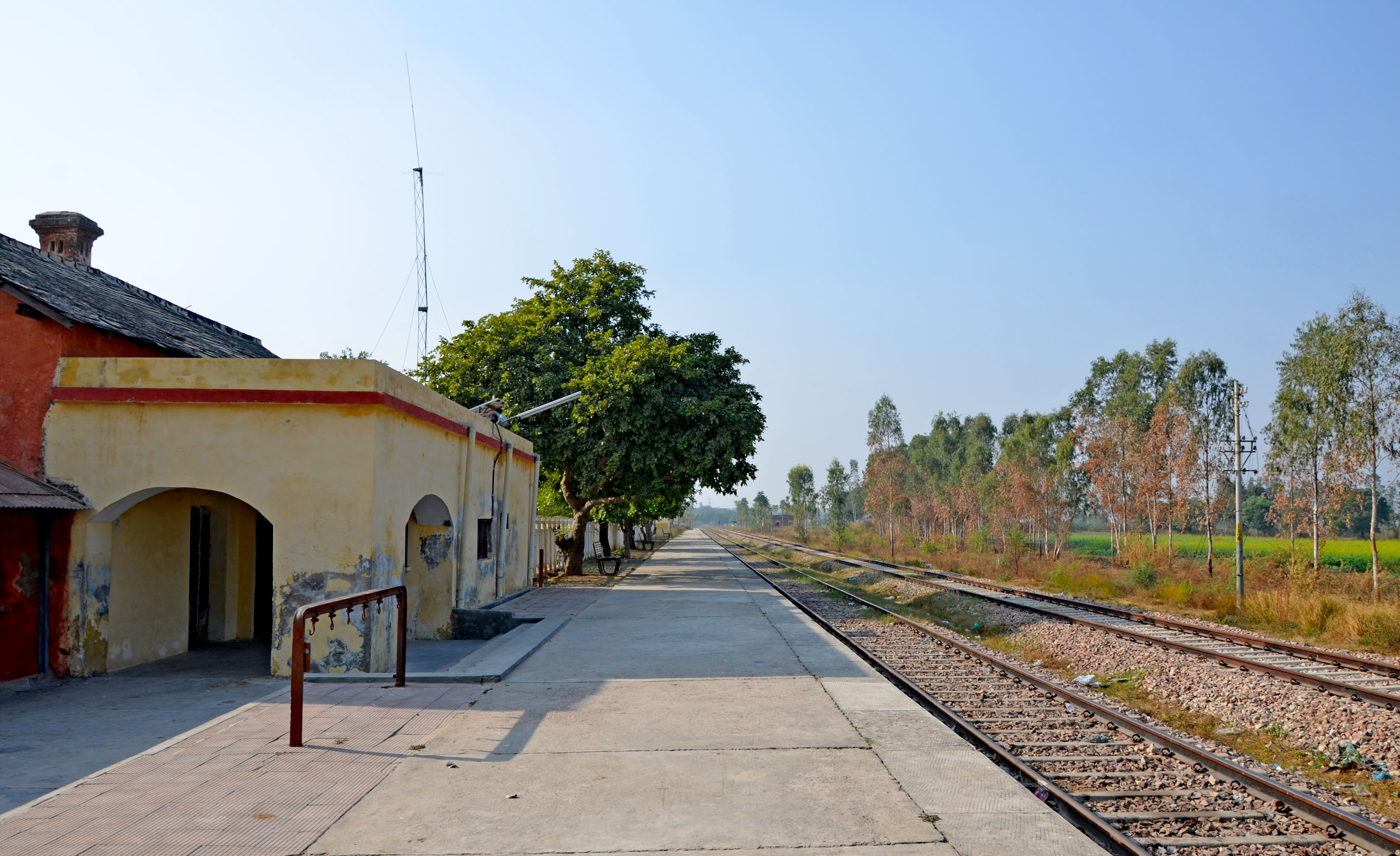
- Farrukhnagar railway station

General information
- Location: State Highway 15A, Haryana; India
- Coordinates: 26.1530°N 81.8063°E
- Elevation: 215 metres (705 ft)
- System: Indian Railways station
- Owner: Indian Railways
- Operator: Northern Railway
- Line: Garhi Harsaru–Farrukhnagar line
- Platforms: 1
- Tracks: 3 (single diesel broad gauge)
- Connections: Auto stand

Construction
- Structure type: Standard (on-ground station)
- Parking: No
- Cycle facilities: No

Other information
- Status: Functioning
- Station code: FN
- Zone(s): Northern Railway
- Division(s): Delhi

History
- Opened: 1901
Location

Farrukhnagar Railway Station is a small railway station in Gurugram district, Haryana. Its code is FN. It serves Farrukhnagar city. The station consists of one platform. The platform is not well sheltered. It lacks many facilities including water and sanitation.

Farrukhnagar lies on a branch line which was laid in 1901 to Garhi Harsaru railway station from Farrukhnagar on Rajputana–Malwa Railway, For many years, the metre-gauge railway line was used to transport salt by steam locomotives and was closed in 2004 for gauge conversion. The converted broad-gauge track became operational in 2011. There has been a demand to extend the track to Jhajjar where it will join Rewari–Jhajjar–Rohtak railway line.

Currently six trains originate and terminate from Farrukhnagar which connects cities like Delhi, Saharanpur, Garhi Harsaru which main junction near the city.

The station was the terminus for India's first ACT1 double decker freight train from Penukoda in Andhra Pradesh on 6 February 2025. The train carried 264 SUV's in 33 wagons.

== Major trains ==
Some of the important trains that run from Farrukhnagar are:

- Farrukhnagar–Delhi Passenger (unreserved)
- Farrukhnagar–Delhi Sarai Rohilla Passenger
- Farrukhnagar–Garhi Harsaru Passenger
- Farrukhnagar–Saharanpur Janta Express (unreserved)
- Farrukhnagar–Garhi Harsaru Heritage Express (weekly on Sunday)
