= Penukonda Junction railway station =

Railway Station in Andhra Pradesh

Penukonda Junction
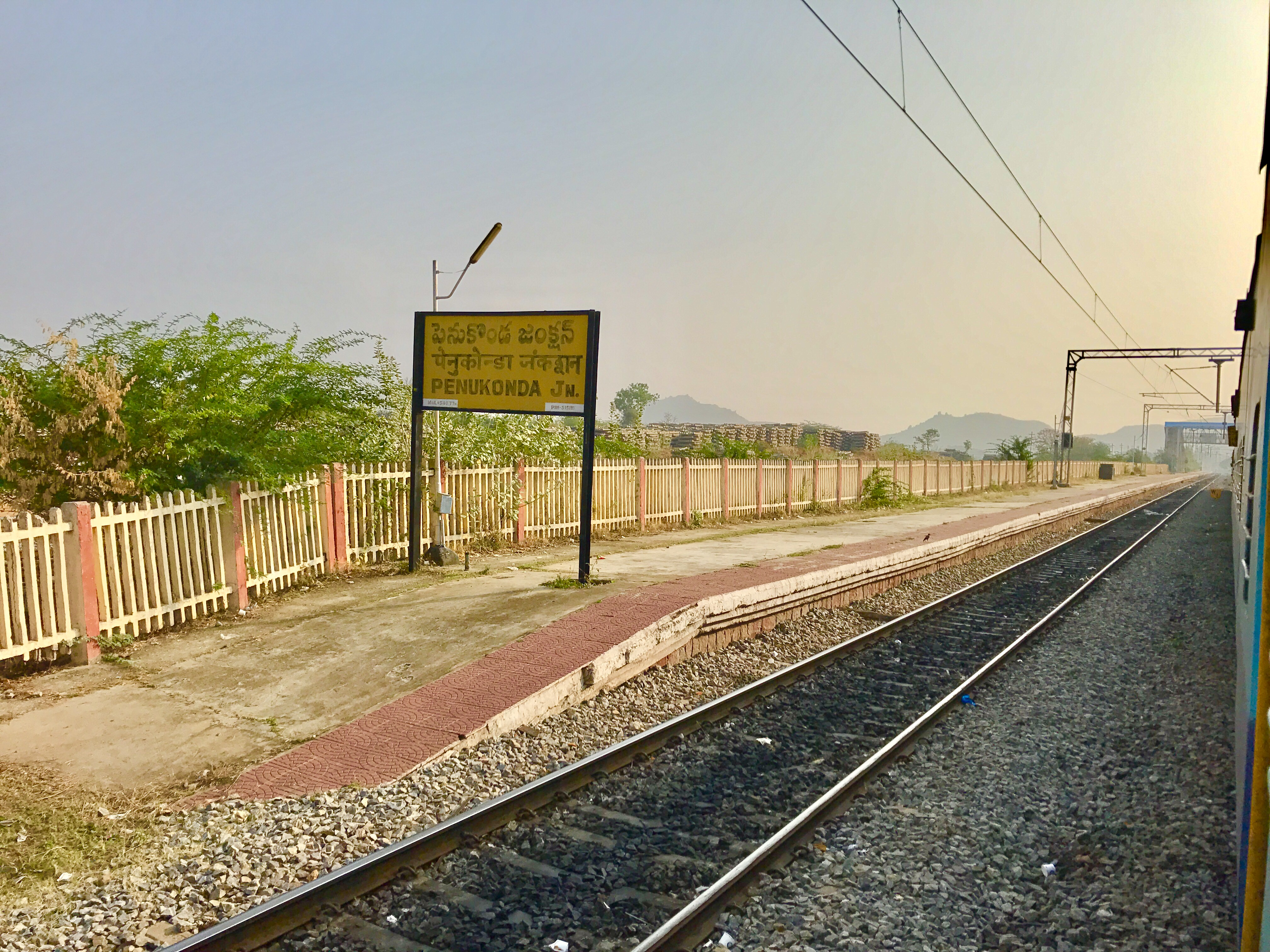
- Penukonda railway station platform 1

General information
- Location: Penukonda, Andhra Pradesh; India
- Elevation: 548 metres (1,798 ft)
- System: Train station
- Owner: Indian Railways
- Line: Guntakal–Bangalore section

Construction
- Parking: Available
- Cycle facilities: Yes

Other information
- Status: Functional
- Station code: PKD
- Fare zone: South Western Railway zone Bangalore railway division
Location
- Location within Andhra Pradesh Location within India

Penukonda Junction (station code: PKD) is the primary railway station serving Penukonda in Andhra Pradesh, India. The station falls under the jurisdiction of Bangalore railway division of South Western Railways. The station has two platforms. The station is situated at junction of three lines branching towards Dharmavaram, Sathya Sai Prasanthi Nilayam and Yesvantpur.

The station was the starting point for India's first ACT1 double decker freight train from to Farukhnagar in Haryana on 6 February 2025. The train carried 264 SUV's in 33 wagons.
