= Garhi Harsaru Junction railway station =

Railway station in Haryana, India

Garhi Harsaru Junction Railway Station

General information
- Location: Dhani Ramnagar, Garhi Harsaru, Gurgaon, Haryana; India
- Coordinates: 28.4383°N 76.9307°E
- Elevation: 221 metres (725 ft)
- System: Indian Railways station
- Owner: Indian Railways
- Operator: Northern Railway
- Platforms: 3
- Tracks: 8
- Connections: Auto stand

Construction
- Structure type: Standard (on-ground station)
- Parking: No
- Cycle facilities: No

Other information
- Status: Functioning
- Station code: GHH
- Zone(s): Northern Railway
- Division(s): Delhi

History
- Opened: 1901
Location

Garhi Harsaru Junction railway station is a small railway station in Gurgaon district, Haryana, India. Its code is GHH. It serves Garhi Harsaru town. The station consists of two platforms. The platform is not well sheltered. It lacks many facilities including water and sanitation.

Garhi Harsaru is a main junction in Gurgaon district due to its proximity to Manesar. A branch line towards Farrukhnagar was laid in 1901 on Rajputana–Malwa Railway. For many years, the metre-gauge railway line was used to transport salt by steam engines and was closed in 2004 for gauge conversion. The converted broad-gauge track became operational in 2011. There has been a demand to extend the track to Jhajjar where it will join In 1982 shooting of famous movie "Gandhi" the station was depicted as Pietermaritzburg where Mahatma Gandhi was thrown out of first class compartment of being non white. Rewari–Jhajjar–Rohtak railway line.

Garhi Harsaru is also a large inland container depot and serves as a hub for transshipment of containers from and to Mumbai Port and seaports on the west coast of India in Gujarat.

== Major trains ==
Some of the important trains that run from Garhi Harsaru Junction are:

- Malani Express
- Ala Hazrat Express
- Farrukhnagar–Saharanpur Janta Express
- Porbandar–Delhi Sarai Rohilla Express
- Delhi–Barmer Link Express
- Mandore Express
- Pooja Superfast Express
- Garhi Harsaru–Farukhnagar Passenger
- Ala Hazrat Express (via Bhildi)
