= Patli =

Coordinates: 29°58′N 78°40′E

Patli is a moderate sized village situated seven kilometres (4.3 mi) from Talwandi Bhai in Firozpur district of Punjab, India.
