= Mandoli =

Mandoli may refer to:

- Heather Mandoli (born 1982), Canadian rower
- Mandoli, Charkhi Dadri, village in Charkhi Dadri district (formerly Bhiwani district), Haryana
- Mandoli, Delhi, census town in North East Delhi
- Mandoli, Rajasthan, village in Jalore district
- a variant of the game of mancala

== See also ==
- Battle of Maonda and Mandholi, Rajasthan (1767)
- Mandholi, a town in Rajasthan
