= Stepwell =

Wells or ponds reached by steps, common in South Asia

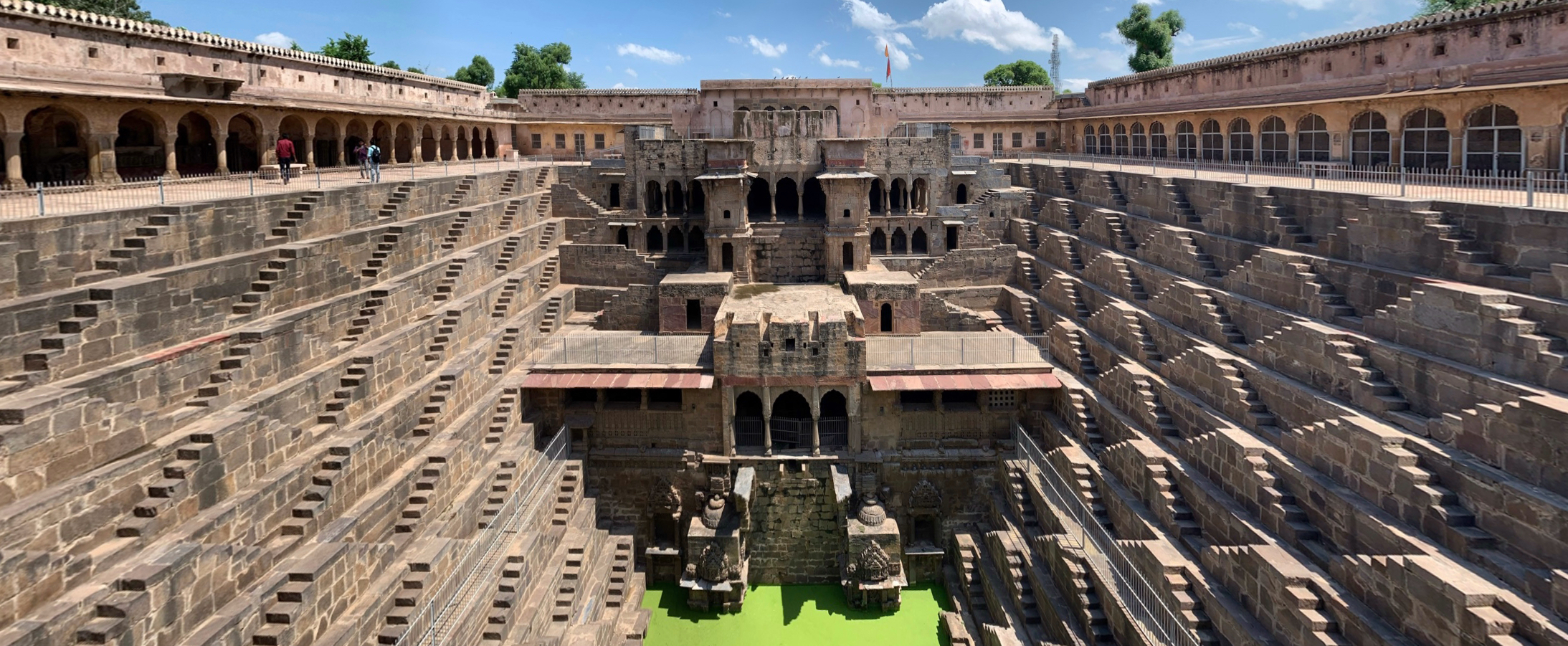
Chand Baori, in the village of Abhaneri near Bandikui, Rajasthan is one of the deepest and largest stepwells in India

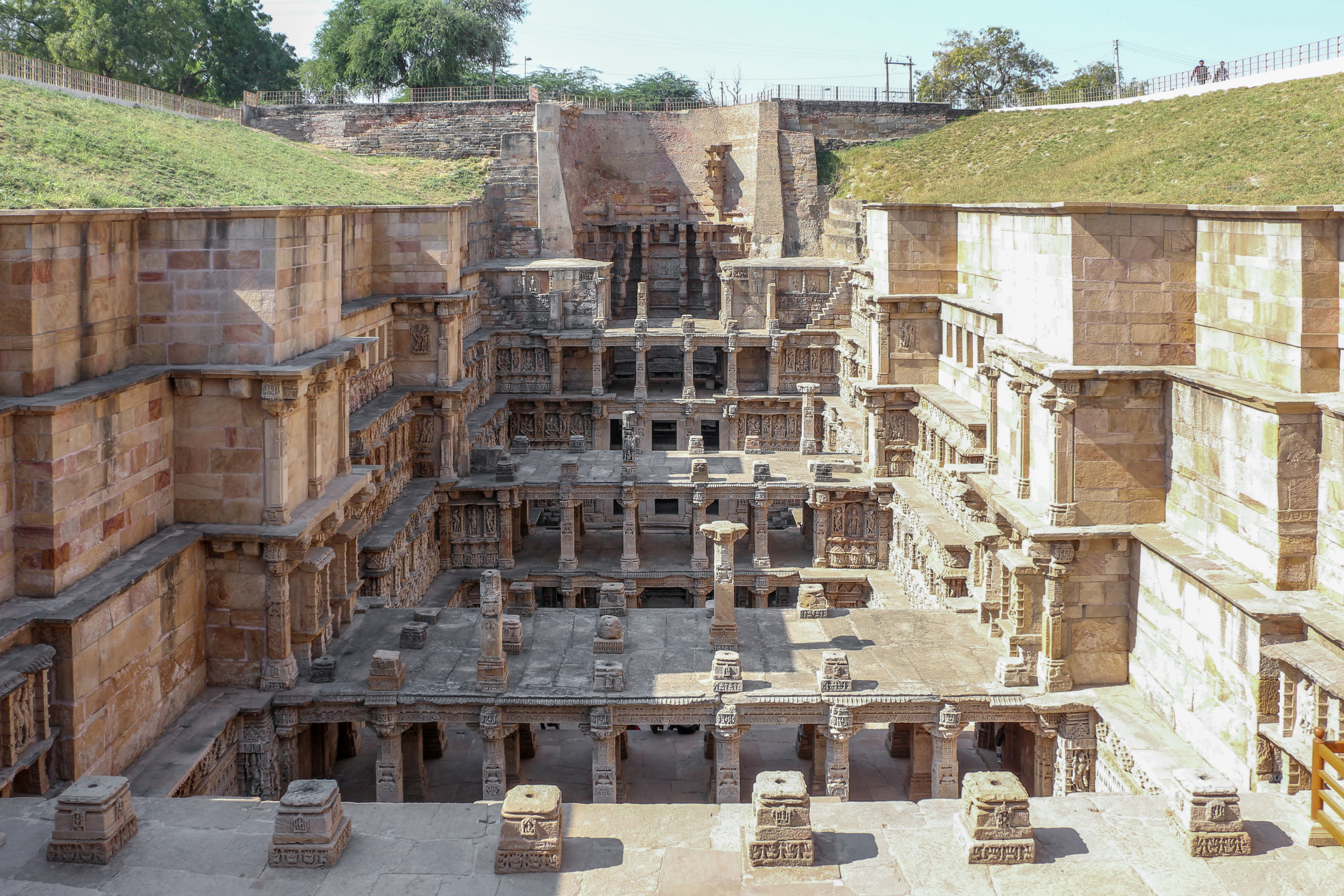
The Rani ki Vav, Patan, Gujarat

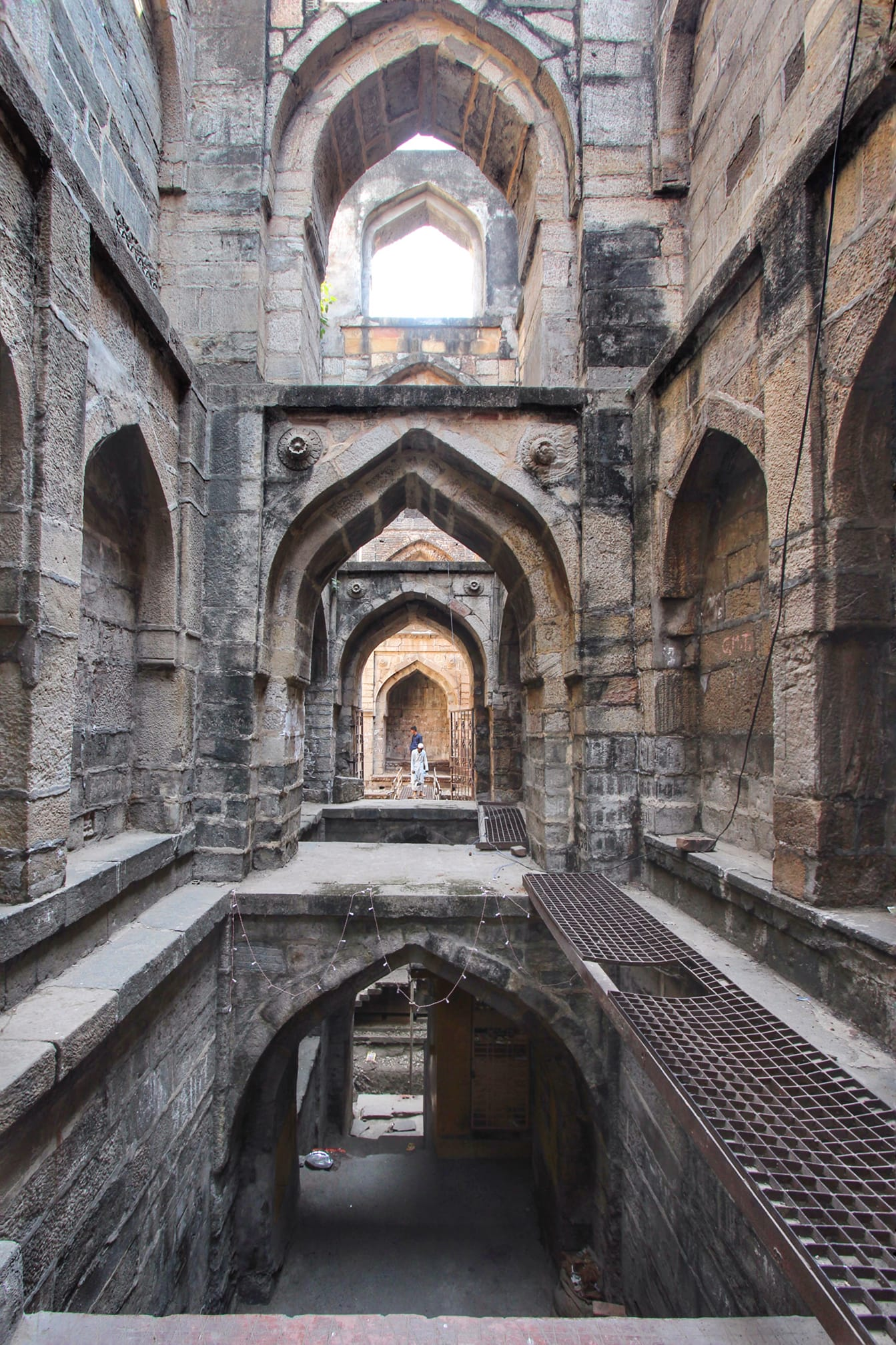
A multi-storey stepwell in Mahimapur Village, Amravati District, Maharashtra

Stepwells, also known as vav (in Gujarati) or baori (in Hindi), are wells, cisterns or ponds with a long corridor of steps that descend to the water level. Stepwells played a significant role in defining subterranean architecture in western India from the 7th to the 19th century. Some stepwells are multi-storeyed and can be accessed by a Persian wheel which is pulled by a bull to bring water to the first or second floor. They are most common in western India and are also found in the other more arid regions of the Indian subcontinent, extending into Pakistan. The construction of stepwells is mainly utilitarian, though they may include embellishments of architectural significance, and may be temple tanks.

Stepwells are examples of the many types of storage and irrigation tanks that were developed in India, mainly to cope with seasonal fluctuations in water availability. A basic difference between stepwells on one hand, and tanks and wells on the other, is that stepwells make it easier for people to reach the groundwater and to maintain and manage the well.

== Basic architecture ==
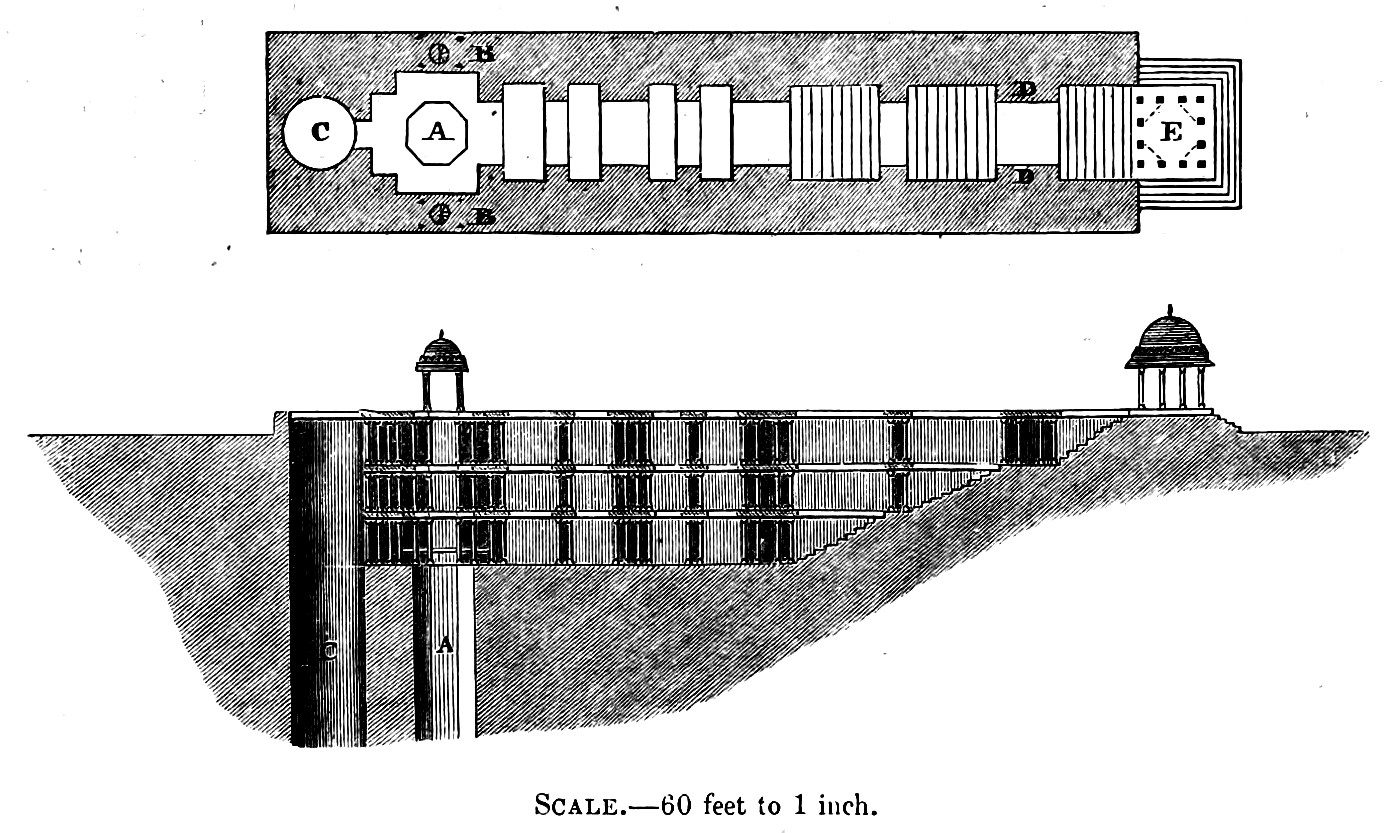
Plan of Dada Harir Stepwell in Gujarat, India

The builders dug deep trenches into the earth for dependable, year-round groundwater. They lined the walls of these trenches with blocks of stone, without mortar, and created stairs leading down to the water. This led to the building of some significant ornamental and architectural features, often associated with dwellings in urban areas. It also ensured their survival as monuments.

A stepwell structure consists of two sections: a vertical shaft from which water is drawn and the surrounding inclined subterranean passageways and the chambers and steps which provide access to the well. The galleries and chambers surrounding these wells were often carved profusely with elaborate detail and became cool, quiet retreats during the hot summers.

== Names ==
A number of distinct names, sometimes local, exist for stepwells. In Hindi-speaking regions, they include names based on baudi (including bawdi (Rajasthani: बावड़ी), bawri, bawari, baori, baoli, bavadi and bavdi). In Gujarati and Marwari language, they are usually called vav, vavri or vaav (Gujarati: વાવ). Other names include kalyani or pushkarani (Kannada), baoli (Hindi: बावली, Punjabi: ਬਾਉਲੀ), barav (Marathi: बारव) and degeenar (Bhojpuri: 𑂙𑂵𑂏𑂲𑂢𑂰𑂩).

== History ==
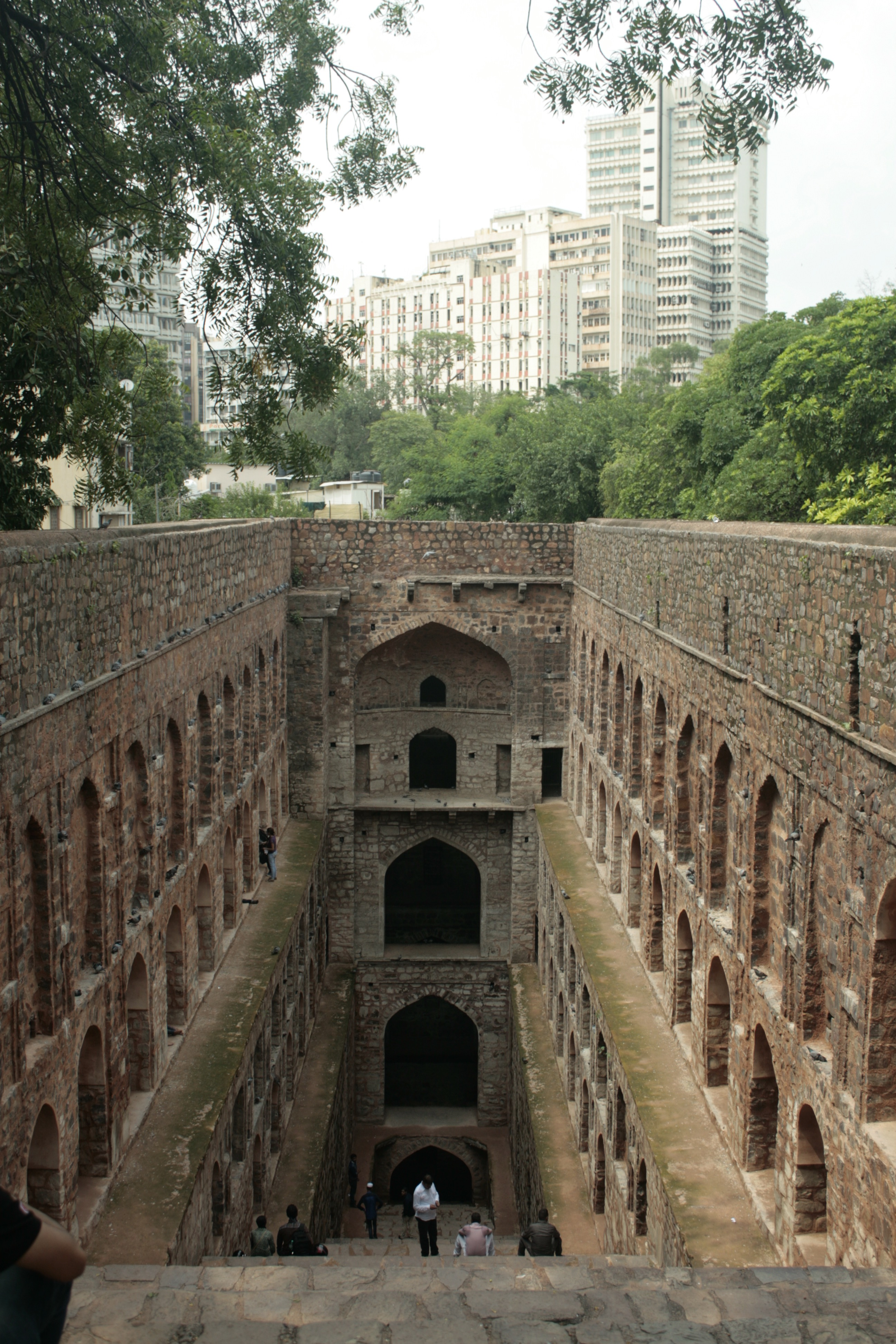
Agrasen Ki Baoli in New Delhi, rebuilt in the 14th century

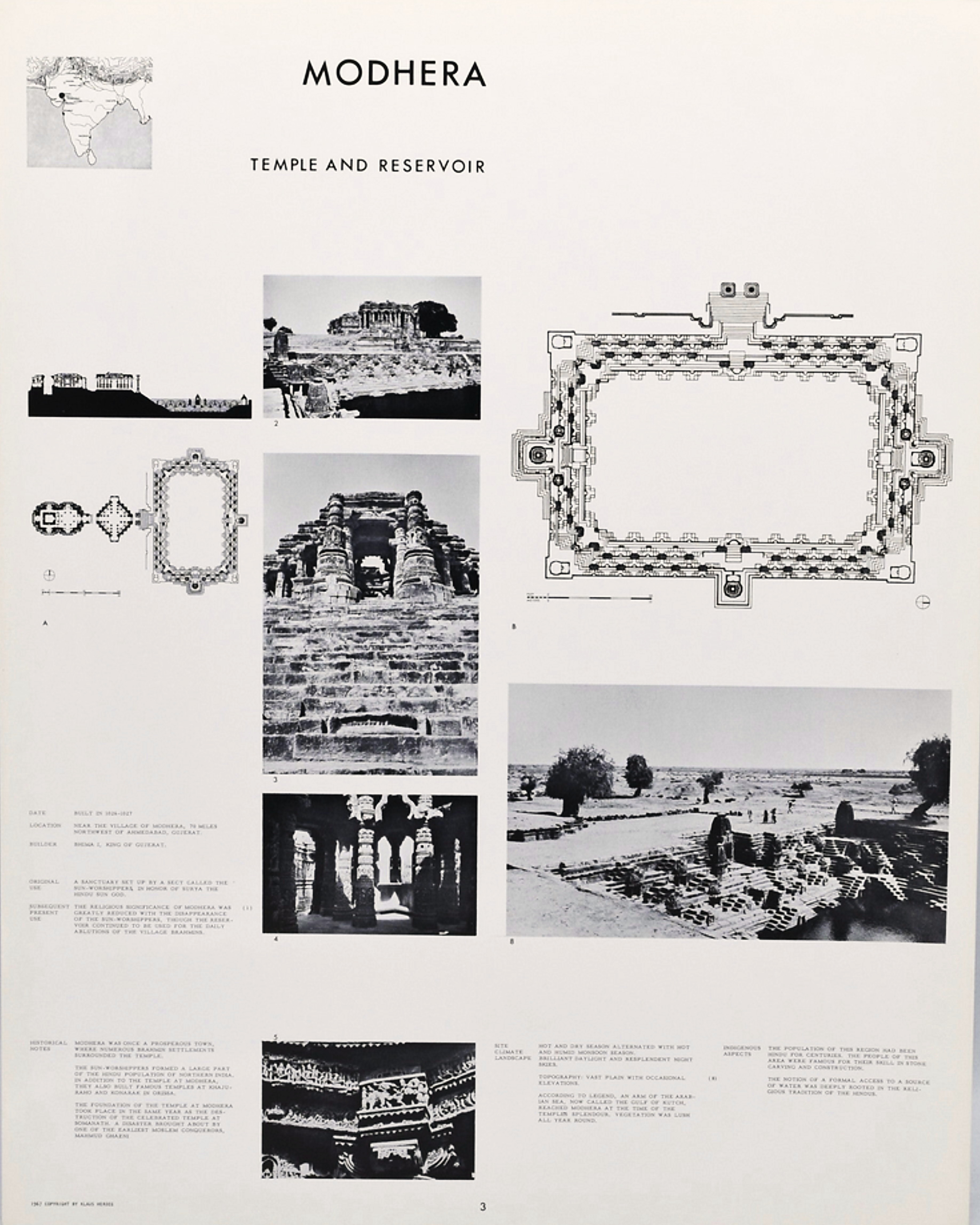
Modhera Sun Temple and Reservoir, in: "Formal Structure in Indian Architcture" Klaus Herdeg (1967)

The stepwell may have originated during periods of drought to ensure enough access to the water. The earliest archaeological evidence of stepwells is found at Dholavira where the site also has water tanks or reservoirs with flights of steps. Mohenjo-daro's great bath is also provided with steps on opposite directions. Ashokan inscriptions mention construction of stepwells along major Indian roads at a distance of every 8 kos (about 20.8 miles or 33.5 km) for the convenience of travellers, but Ashoka states that it was a well-established practice which predated him and was done by former kings as well.

King Devanampriya Priyadarsin speaks thus. On the roads banyan-trees were caused to be planted by me, (in order that) they might afford shade to cattle and men, (and) mango-groves were caused to be planted. And (at intervals) of eight kos wells were caused to be dug by me, and flights of steps (for descending into the water) were caused to be built. Numerous drinking-places were caused to be established by me, here and there, for the enjoyment of cattle and men. [But] this so-called enjoyment (is) [of little consequence]. For with various comforts have the people been blessed both by former kings and by myself. But by me this has been done for the following purpose: that they might conform to that practice of morality.

— Ashokan Pillar Edict No 7

The first rock-cut stepwells in India date from 200 to 400 AD. The earliest example of a bath-like pond reached by steps is found at Uperkot caves in Junagadh. These caves are dated to the 4th century. Navghan Kuvo, a well with the circular staircase in the vicinity, is another example. It was possibly built in Western Satrap (200–400 AD) or Maitraka (600–700 AD) period, though some place it as late as the 11th century. The nearby Adi Kadi Vav was constructed either in the second half of the 10th century or the 15th century.

The stepwells at Dhank in Rajkot district are dated to 550–625 AD. The stepped ponds at Bhinmal (850–950 AD) are followed by it. The stepwells were constructed in the southwestern region of Gujarat around 600 AD; from there they spread north to Rajasthan and subsequently to the north and west India. Initially used as an art form by Hindus, the construction of these stepwells hit its peak during Muslim rule from the 11th to 16th century.

One of the earliest existing examples of stepwells was built in the 11th century in Gujarat, the Mata Bhavani's Stepwell. A long flight of steps leads to the water below a sequence of multi-story open pavilions positioned along the east–west axis. The elaborate ornamentation of the columns, brackets and beams are a prime example of how stepwells were used as a form of art.

The Mughal emperors did not disrupt the culture that was practiced in these stepwells and encouraged the building of stepwells. The authorities during the British Raj found the hygiene of the stepwells less than desirable and installed pipe and pump systems to replace their purpose. In recent years with increasing water shortages in India some stepwells have been restored to their original purpose.

== Location ==
Stepwells are generally located in two places - as an extension or part of a temple, and/or the outskirts of a village. When a stepwell is associated with a temple or a shrine, it is either at the opposite wall of it or in front of the temple. Sindhvai Mata stepwell in Patan, Mata Bhavani stepwell in Ahmedabad, and the Ankol Mata stepwell in Davad serve as a great example of the stepwells that house shrines.

== Function and use ==
The stepwell ensures the availability of water during periods of drought. The stepwells had social, cultural and religious significance. These stepwells were proven to be well-built sturdy structures, after withstanding earthquakes. Stepwells and wells played a critical role in serving as a direct means to fresh water across much of India where an abundance of fresh water is only available during the monsoon season. Because stepwells are built without mortar, groundwater below the water table line will filter through the stone and into the wells. While the rivers, rivulets, creeks, and other natural water bodies dry up in this climate zone, stepwells remain at a depth where there is less exposure to sun and heat. The majority of surviving stepwells originally served a leisure purpose alongside being the main source of water for basic needs like bathing, washing clothes, farming, and watering animals. Stepwells also served as a place for social gatherings and religious ceremonies. Usually, women were more associated with these wells because they were the ones who collected the water. Also, it was they who prayed and offered gifts to the goddess of the well for her blessings.

The well-water is known to attract insects, animals, and many other germ breeding organisms. These stepwells, being a common space in frequent use by the inhabitants of the area, were considered to be a source of spreading epidemics and diseases.

== Details ==
Many stepwells have ornamentation and details as elaborate as those of Hindu temples. Proportions in relationship to the human body were used in their design, as they were in many other structures in Indian architecture.

== Stepped ponds ==
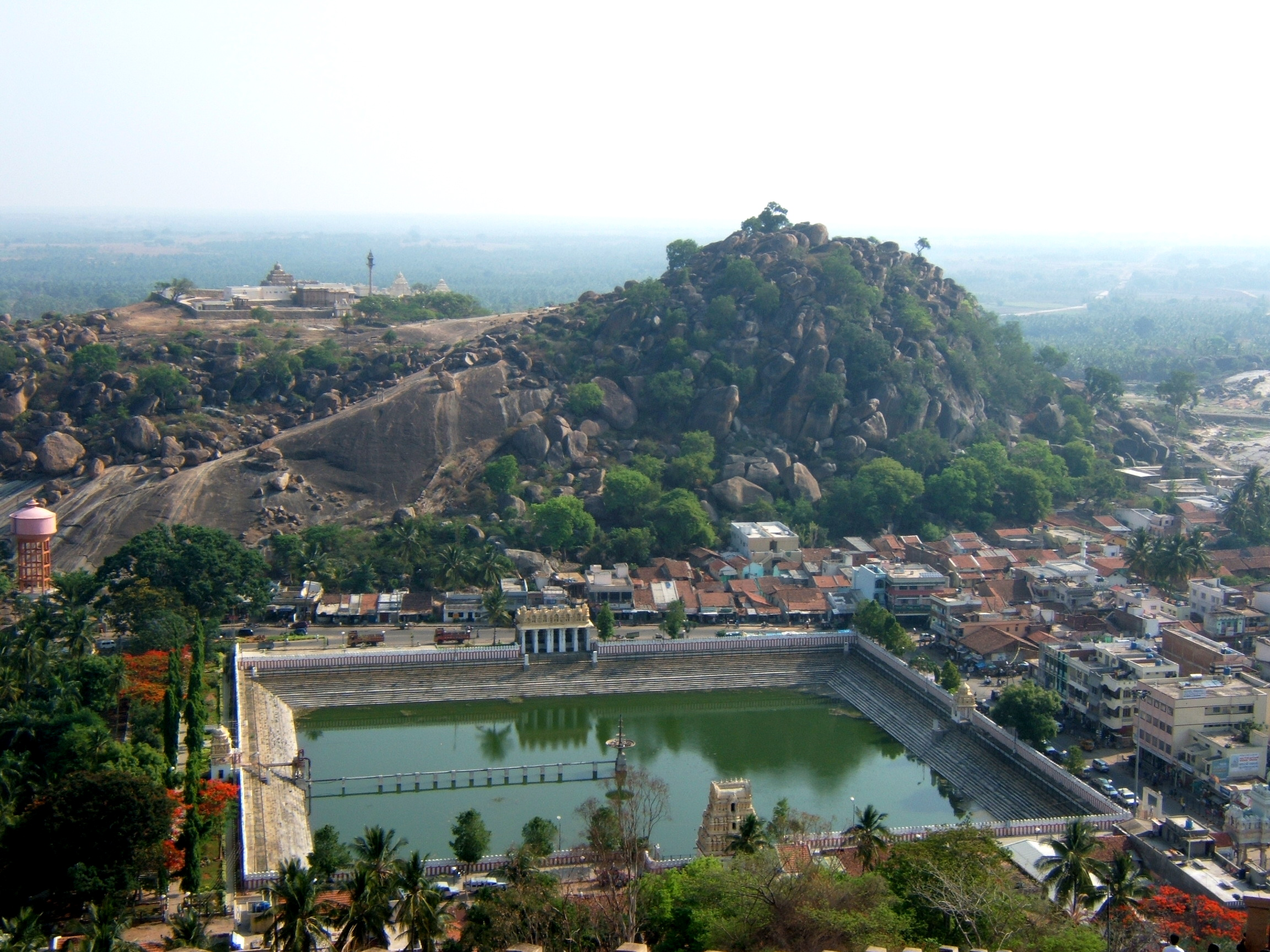
Shravanabelagola stepped pond, Karnataka

Stepped ponds are very similar to stepwells in terms of purpose. Generally, stepped ponds accompany nearby temples while stepwells are more isolated. Stepwells are dark and barely visible from the surface, while stepped ponds are illuminated by the light from the sun. Stepwells are more linear in design compared to the rectangular shape of stepped ponds.

== In India ==
A number of surviving significant stepwells in India can be found across India, including in Rajasthan, Gujarat, Delhi, Madhya Pradesh, Maharashtra, and North Karnataka (Karnataka). In 2016 a collaborative mapping project, Stepwell Atlas, started to map GPS coordinates and collate information on stepwells, mapping over 2800 stepwells in India. Another project mapped the location of over 1700 stepwells in Maharashtra.

One of the first western architects, "who placed a spotlight on the neglected, albeit paramount water structures" as representative for the country’s ritualistic life and culture, was Klaus Herdeg in 1967. In his research on Formal Structure(s) in Indian Architecture he presented i.a. Indian stepwells with photos and exact measurement drawings.

=== Delhi and Haryana ===
==== Delhi ====
In his book Delhi Heritage: Top 10 Baolis, Vikramjit Singh Rooprai mentions that Delhi alone has 32 stepwells.

- Agrasen Ki Baoli
- Baolis of Mehrauli
- Dwarka Baoli
- Rajon Ki Baoli

==== Haryana ====
- Ambala district: Gurudwara Manji Sahib Baoli, on NH-44 in Ambala, was built by the sixth Sikh Guru, Guru Hargobind.
- Faridabad district: Surajkund
- Gurugram district
  - Badshahpur:
    - Badshahpur Stepwell
    - Akhara Stepwell
    - Dhumaspur Stepwell
  - Farrukhnagar: Baoli Ghaus Ali Shah (Gol Bavdi) was built by Ghaus Ali Shah.
- Jhajjar district: Luhari Baoli (also known as Muglaai Baoli) 8 km northwest of Pataudi on SH-132.
- Kaithal district: Bhai ki Baoli, near NH-152A, was built in lakhori bricks by the Jat Sikh rulers of Kaithal State.
- Kurukshetra district: Bhai Lakhi Shah Banjara Baoli at Ishargarh, 7 km north of Pipli bus stand on NH-44 GT Road, was constructed by Bhai Lakhi Rai Banjara.
- Mahendragarh district
  - Narnaul
    - Nagpurian Baoli, 18th-century three tier stepwell next to the Chotta Bada Talab and Shiv Temple
    - Baba Kheta Nath Baoli
- Nuh district: Kotla Bavdi
- Rewari district: Solahrahi Baoli
- Rohtak district: Choro ki Baoli at Maham.

=== Gujarat ===
- Rani ki Vav at Patan
- Adalaj stepwell at Adalaj, Gandhinagar
- Dada Harir Stepwell, Ahmedabad
- Navghan Kuvo
- Adi Kadi vav
- Vanarashi Vav, Vavdi, Bhavnagar district
- Boter Kothani Vav, Mehsana
- Modhera Vav

=== Haryana ===
- Baoli Ghaus Ali Shah, Farrukhnagar, Gurugram district

=== Karnataka ===
- Kalyani, Hulikere
- Bhoga Nandeeshwara Temple, Karnataka

=== Kerala ===
- Sree Peralassery Temple

=== Maharashtra ===
- Charthana Stepwell, Parbhani
- Pingli Stepwell, Parbhani
- Arvi Stepwell, Parbhani
- Baramotichi Vihir, Limb, Satara

=== Rajasthan ===
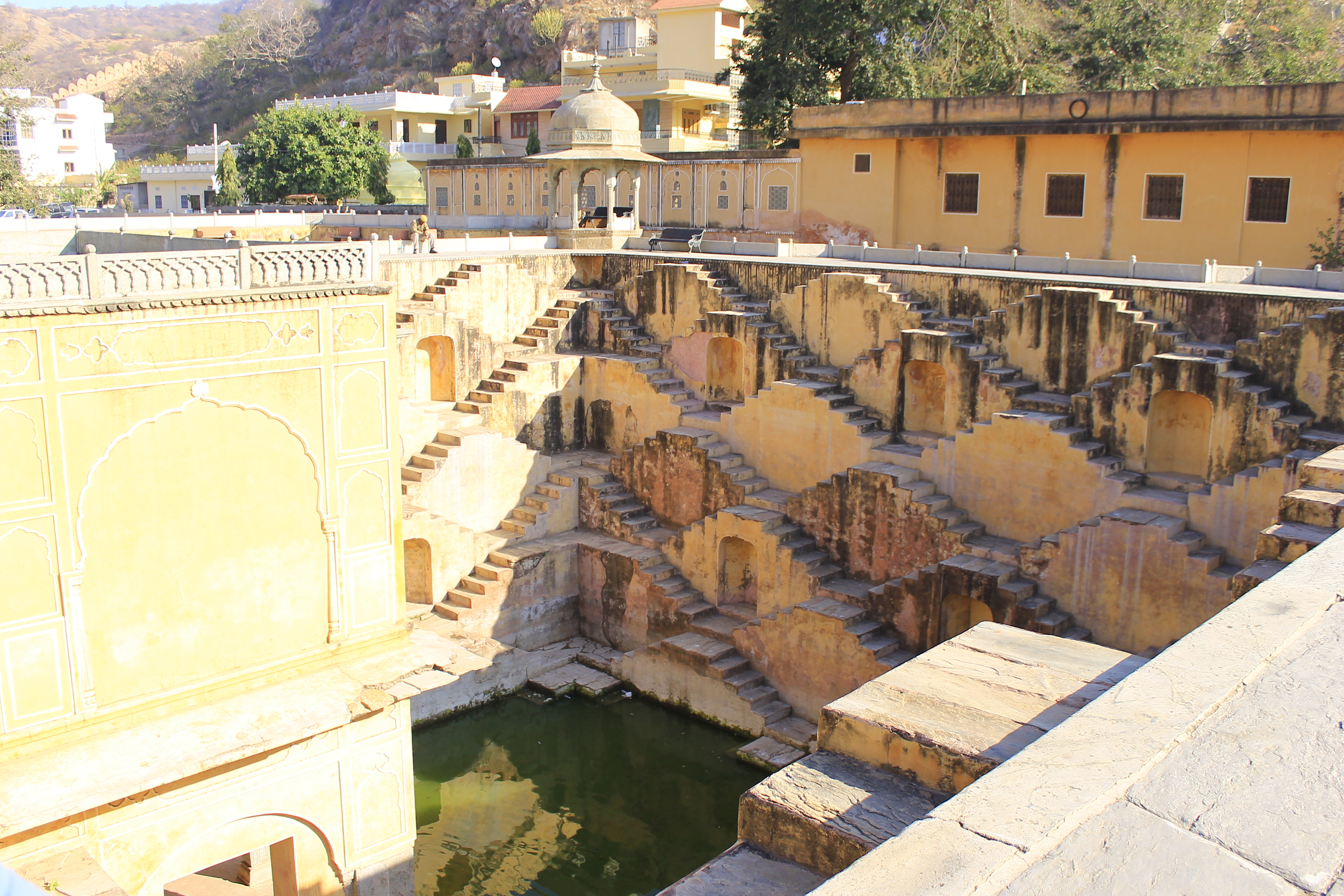
Panna Meena ka Kund stepwell in Amber, India

- Bundi: has over 60 baolis in and around the town.
  - Raniji ki Baori in Bundi
  - Nagar Sagar Kund
- Jaipur:
  - Chand Baori in Abhaneri near Jaipur
  - Panna Meena ka Kund, Amber
- Jodhpur
  - Birkha Bawari,
- Neem Ka Thana
  - Udoji ki Baori at Mandholi 5 km north of Neem ka Thana on Neem ka Thana-Mandholi-Khetri highway.

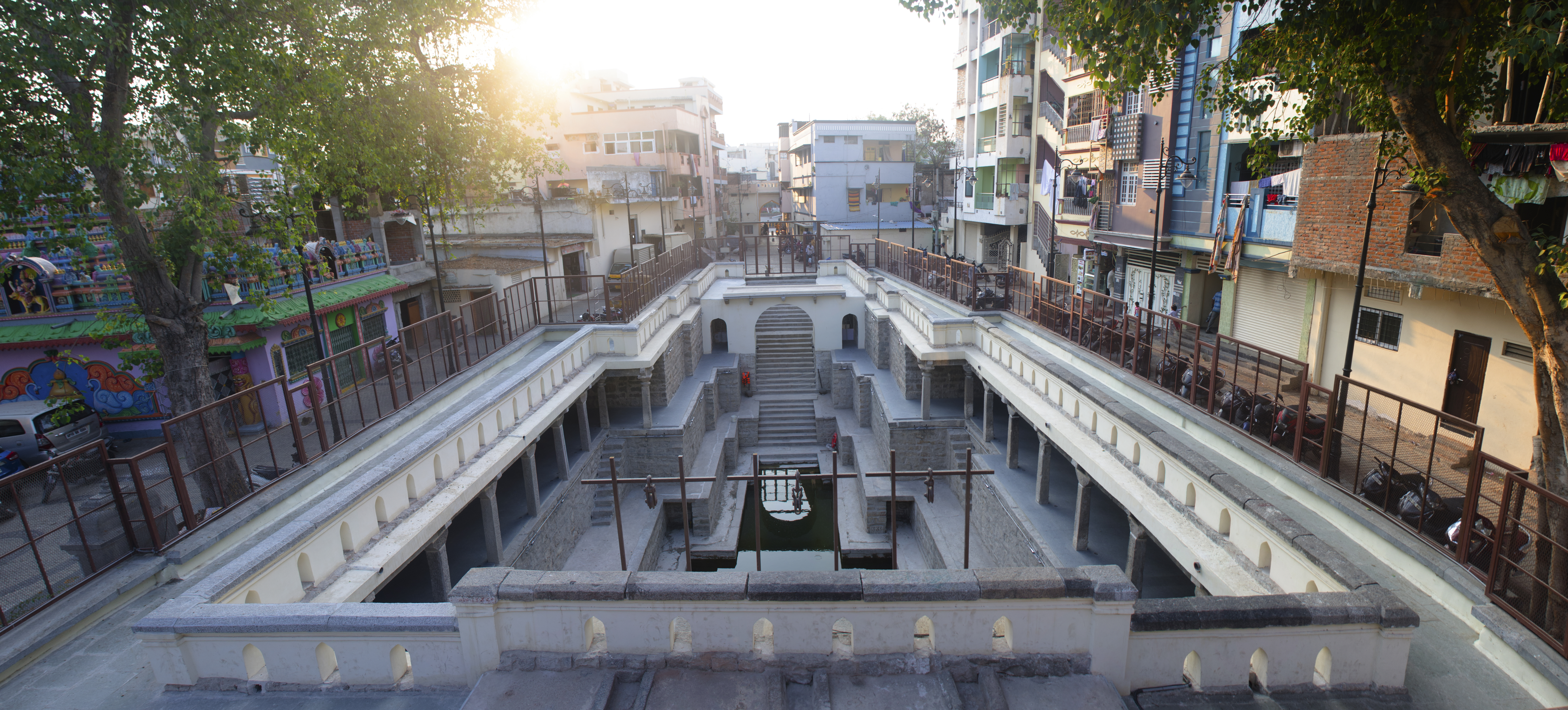
Bansilalpet Stepwell, Hyderabad

=== Telangana ===
- Bansilalpet Stepwell in Hyderabad
- Korutla Stepwell
- K.W. Bagh, Alijah Kotla, Hyderabad

=== Uttar Pradesh ===
- Shahi Baoli, Lucknow

== In Pakistan ==
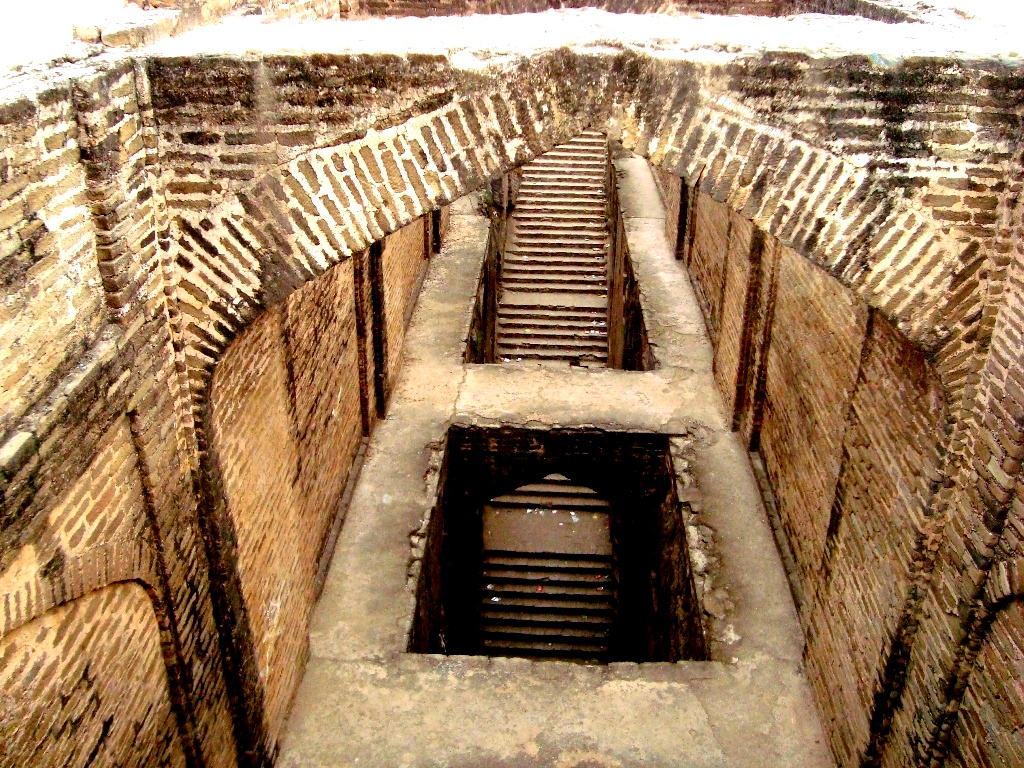
Stepwell at Rohtas Fort, near Jhelum. Constructed by Emperor Sher Shah Suri: carving into the limestone bedrock in the 16th century, approx. 100 feet deep, originally would have been twice as much but has covered by silt. It was in use until 2019.

Stepwells from Mughal periods still exist in Pakistan. Some are in preserved conditions while others are not.

- Bahar Wali Boali Bahar Wali Baoli, in Kharian
- Rohtas Fort, near Jhelum
- Wan Bhachran, near Mianwali
- Losar Baoli, near Islamabad
- Makli Baoli, near Thatta

== Influence ==
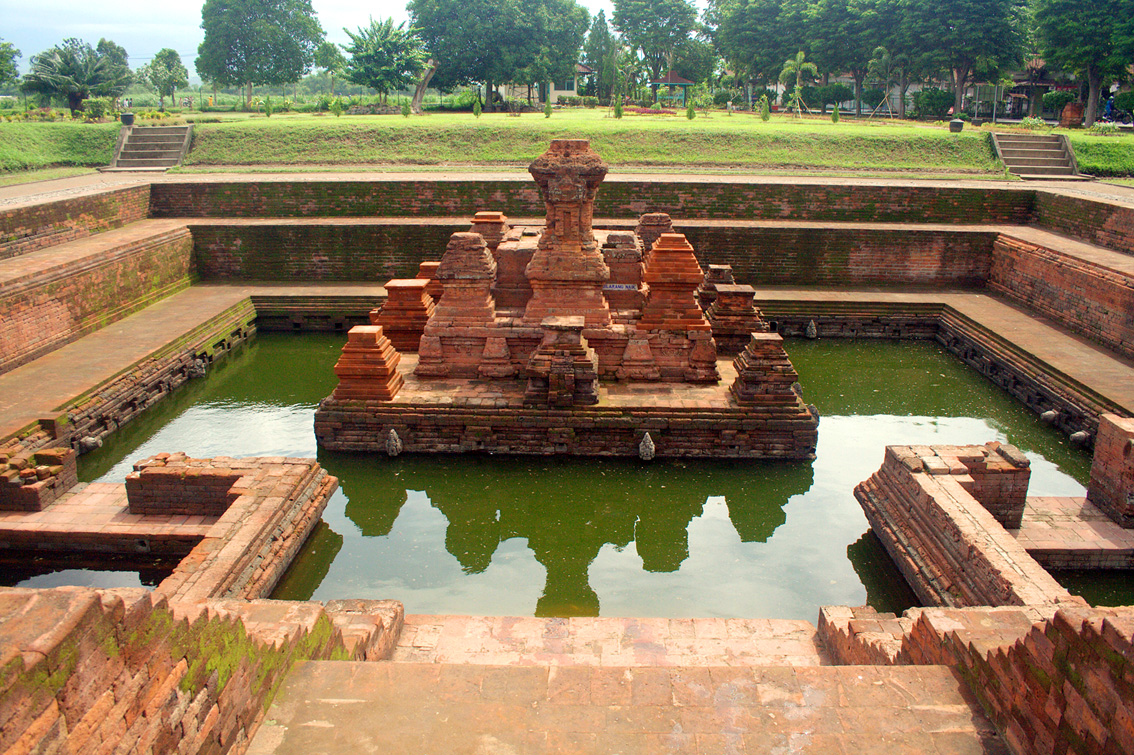
Candi Tikus, a 14th-century bathing place and step well in Majapahit empire capital city, Trowulan Archaeological Park, East Java, Indonesia

Stepwells influenced many other structures in Indian architecture, especially those that incorporate water into their design. For example, the Aram Bagh in Agra was the first Mughal garden in India. It was designed by the Mughal emperor Babur and reflected his notion of paradise not only through water and landscaping but also through symmetry by including a reflecting pool in the design. He was inspired by stepwells and felt that one would complement the garden of his palace. Many other Mughal gardens include reflecting pools to enhance the landscape or serving as an elegant entrance. Other notable gardens in India which incorporate water into their design include:

- Humayun's Tomb, Nizamuddin East, Delhi
- Taj Mahal, Agra
- Mehtab Bagh, Agra
- Safdarjung's Tomb
- Shalimar Bagh (Srinagar), Jammu and Kashmir
- Nishat Gardens, Jammu and Kashmir
- Yadvindra Gardens, Pinjore
- Khusro Bagh, Allahabad
- Roshanara Bagh

== Gallery ==
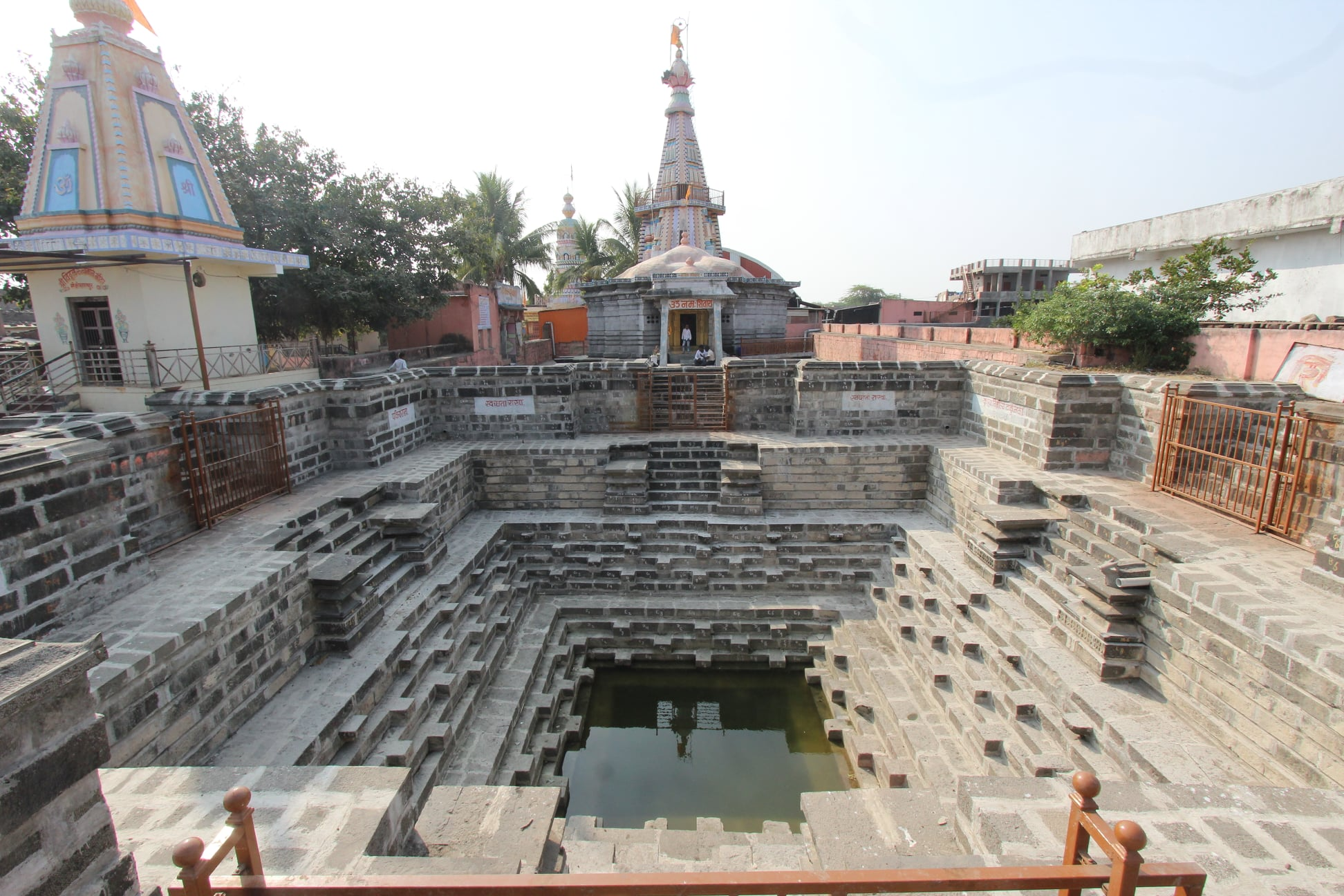
Large stepwell at Nagnath Mandir in Hatnoor Village, Parbhani District in Maharashtra

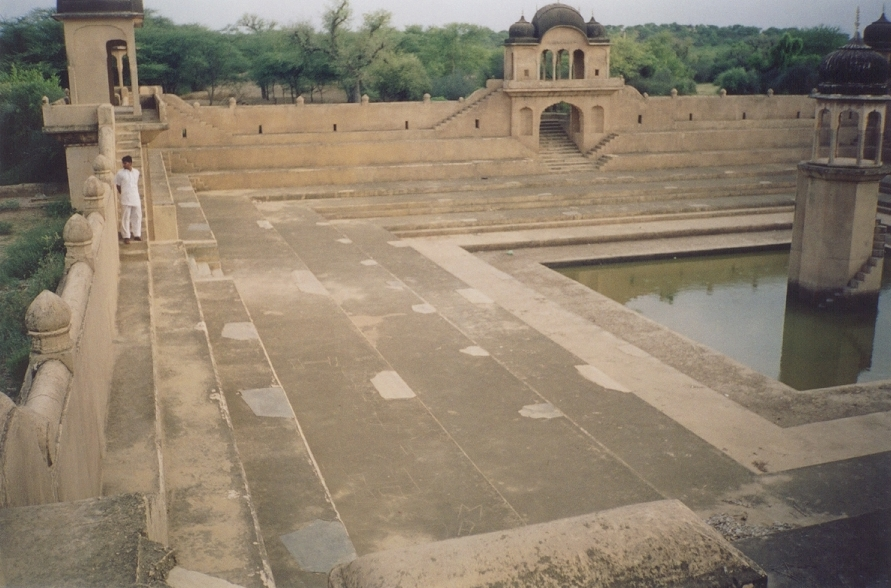
View of a stepwell at Fatehpur, Shekhawati

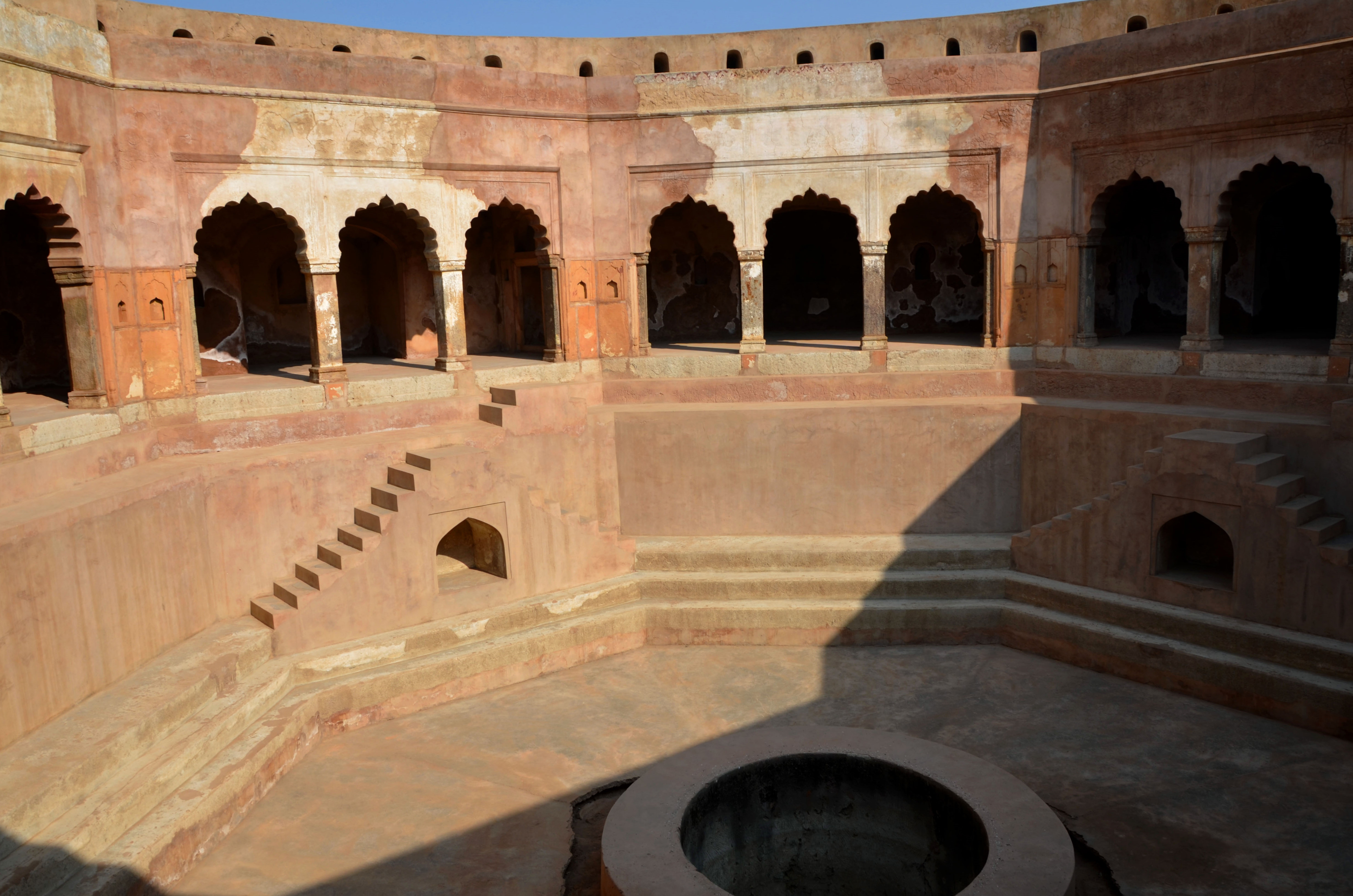
The 18th-century Baoli Ghaus Ali Shah, in Farrukhnagar, Haryana

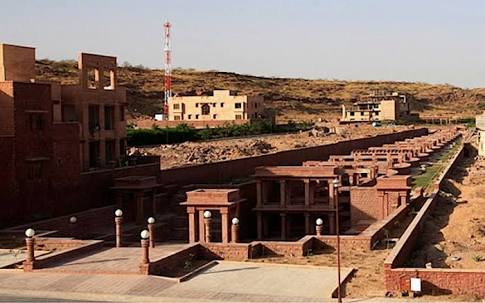
Birkha Bawari, a stepwell at Jodhpur

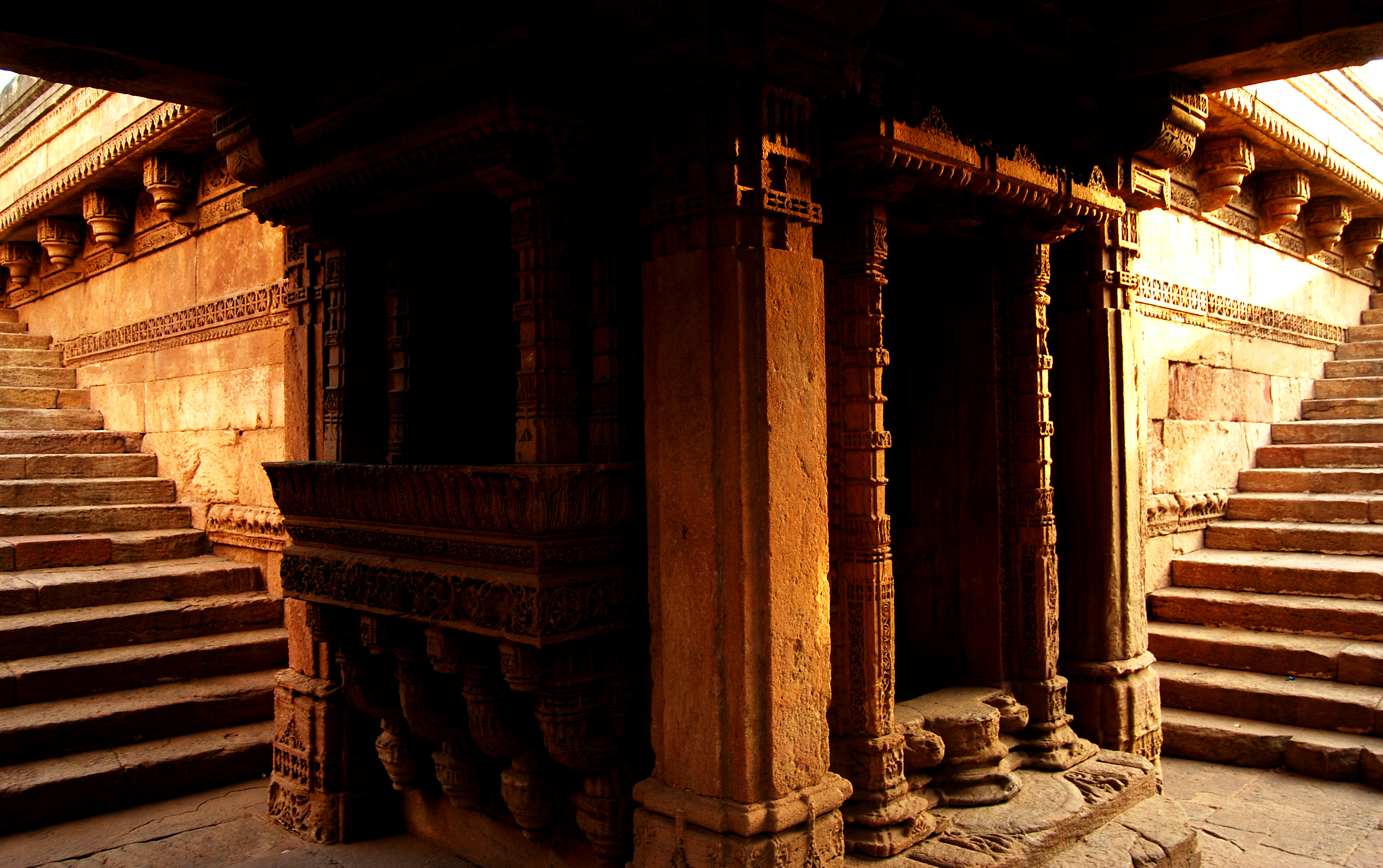
Rudabai stepwell or Adalaj ni Vav at Adalaj, Gandhinagar, Gujarat

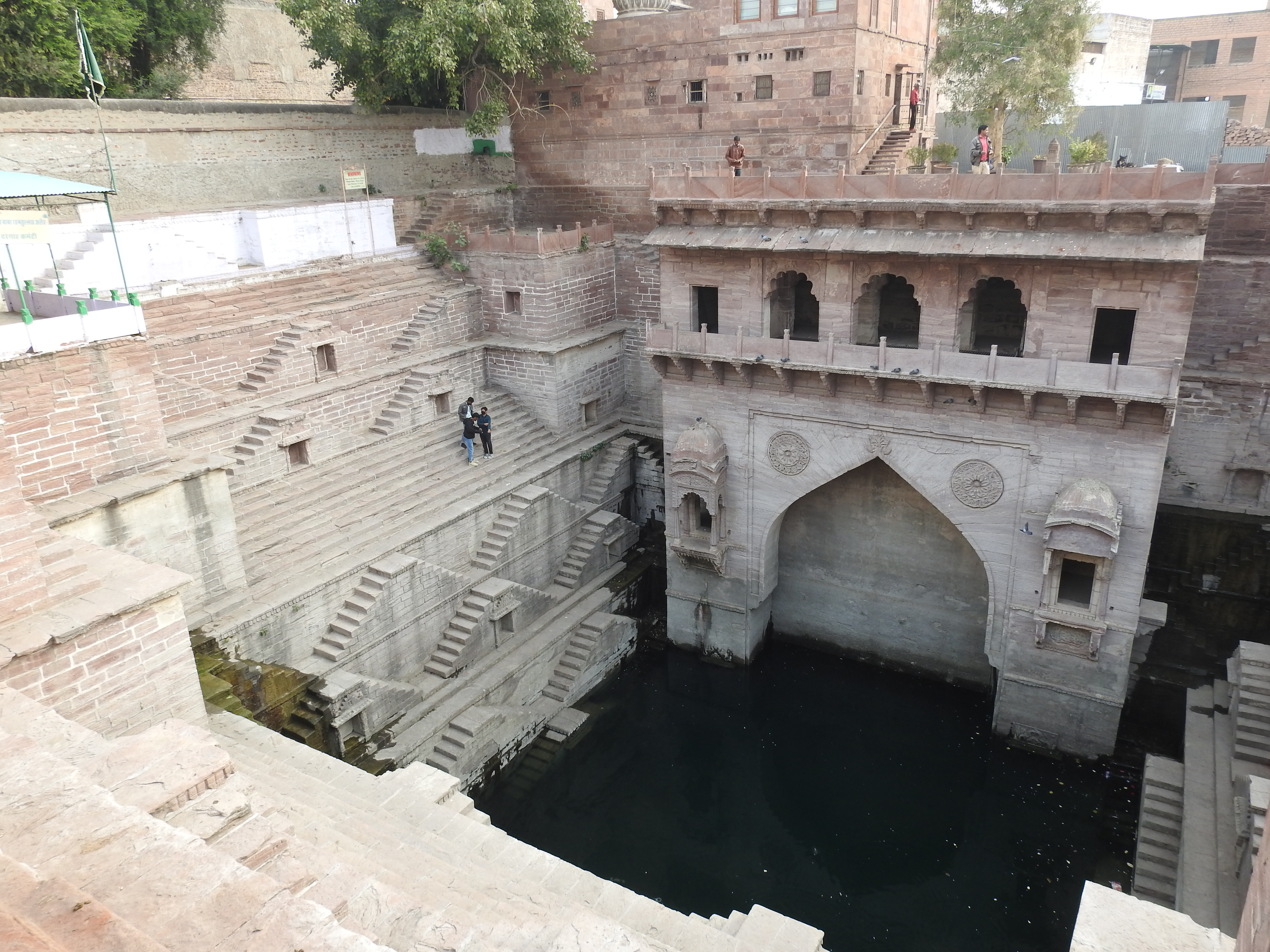
Toor Ji Ka Jhalra, stepped well, Jodhpur

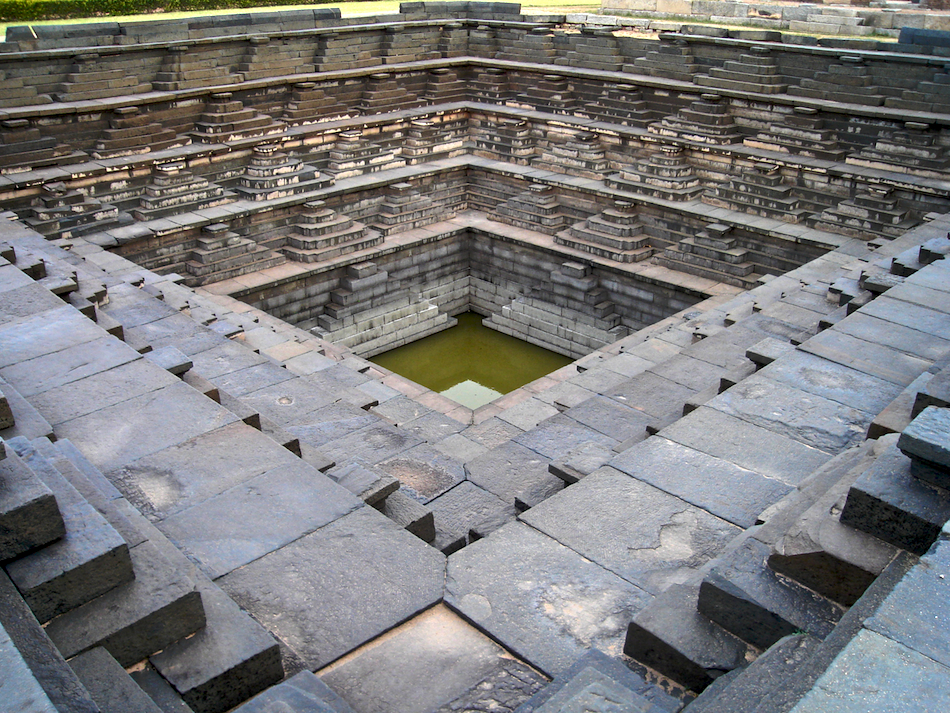
Stepped well, Hampi

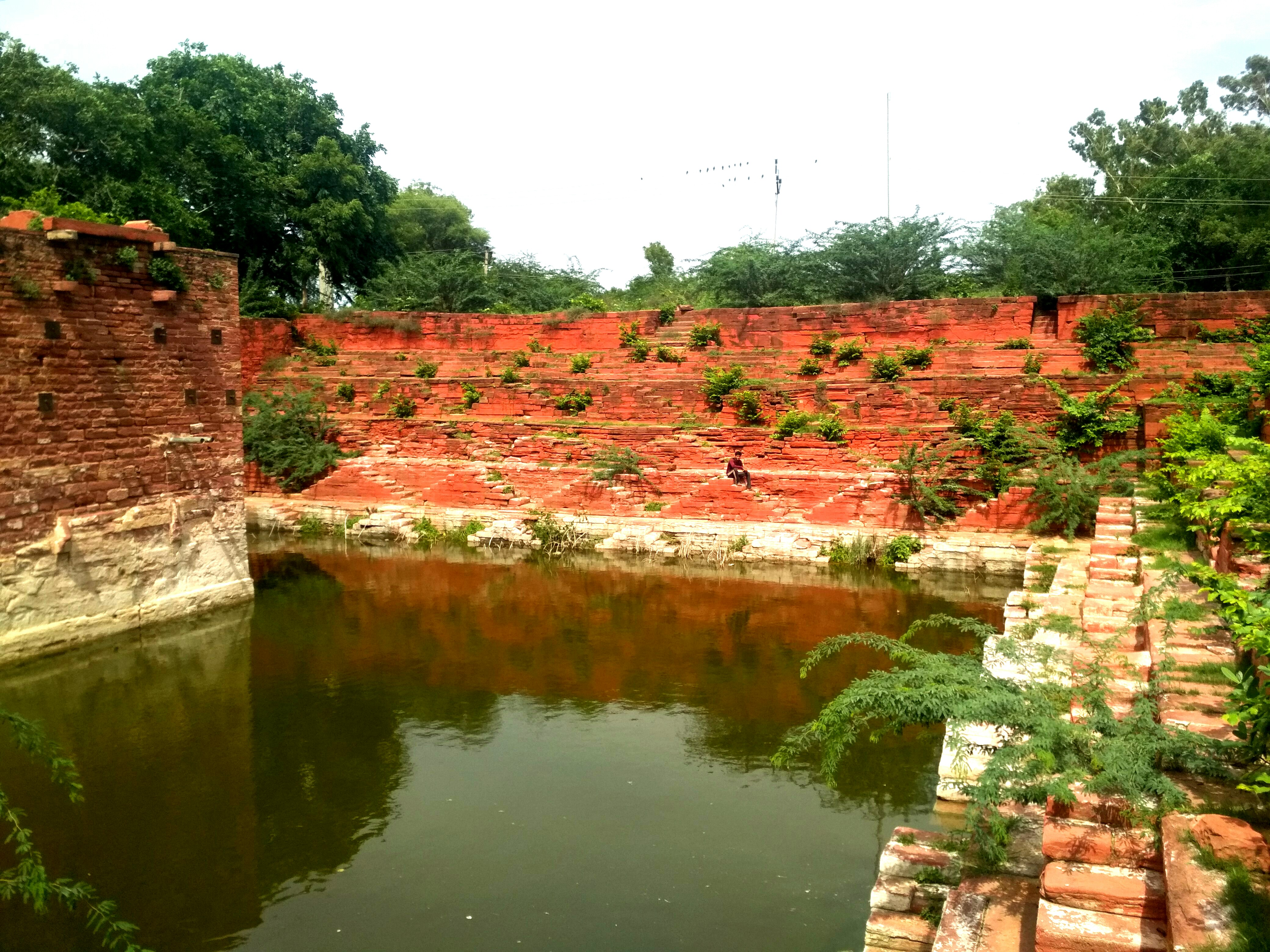
Jachcha Ki Baori in Hindaun, Rajasthan

== See also ==
- Ancient India
  - Water supply and sanitation in the Indus-Saraswati Valley Civilisation
  - History of stepwells in Gujarat
- Water resources in India
- Johad – Traditional rainwater-storage wetland in India
- Dhunge dhara – Stone drinking fountains in Nepal
- Vessel (structure) – Structure in Manhattan, New York - modeled after Indian stepwells
