= Klaus Herdeg =

Swiss-American architect (1937–2009)

Klaus Herdeg (born March 4, 1937 in Paris; died February 21, 2009 in New York City) was a Swiss architect, professor, and author.

== Background ==
Klaus Walter Herdeg was the eldest son of Swiss photographer Hugo Paul Herdeg (1909–1953), who had followed his brother Walter to Paris in 1932. There he moved in the circles of famous artists (including, among others, Pablo Picasso, Georges Braque, Fernand Léger) and architects, and held a permanent position at the Musée de l'Homme. In 1939, he returned to Switzerland due to the outbreak of the Second World War. In 1942, his second son, Christian, was born.

== Career ==
Klaus Herdeg attended Waldorf schools in Switzerland and England. From 1953 to 1966 he was apprentice, draftsman, designer and job captain for various firms in Switzerland, England an the United States and graduated from Cornell University in 1963 with a Bachelor's degree (B.Arch '63) and in 1964 with a Master of Architecture and Urban Design (MAUD '64) from Harvard. He is a member of the Swiss Society of Engineers and Architects. Note: Materials outside his academic career are located in the Archives of Columbia University in Series IV.

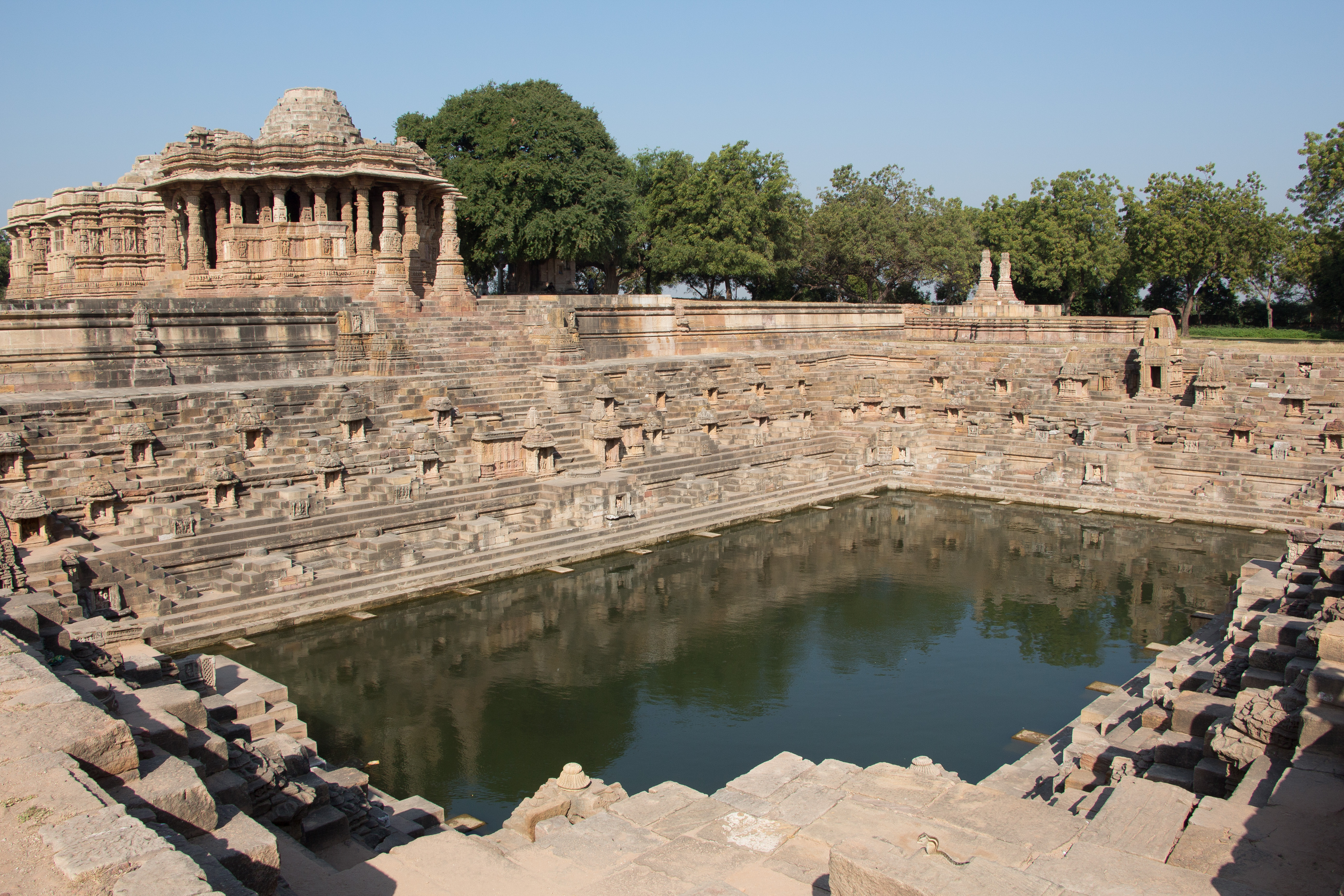
Sun Temple, Modhera, Gujarat, explored by Herdeg in 1967

In 1965, he received the Robert James Eidlitz Travel Fellowship from Cornell University. In his application for the fellowship Herdeg wrote he wished to travel to India to conduct research on Le Corbusier's Chandigarh. Presumably under the influence of B. V. Doshi, he instead devoted three months to an in-depth study of Hindu and Islamic architecture by travelling throughout northwestern India. He created architectural survey drawings of eight public buildings and complexes to explain and determine their formal and spatial structural principles (Example: Hoshang’s Mausoleum in Mandu. In 1967, with the support of Columbia University and the Rhode Island School of Design, this resulted in a traveling exhibition as well as a portfolio box set with 700 limited-edition copies. Under the title “Formal Structure in Indian Architecture,” this work was published as a book in 1990 by Rizzoli, New York.

In 1966, Herdeg began working as a professor at the College of Architecture, Art and Planning at Cornell University. There, he experienced a period of unrest that culminated in a cross burning in front of the Wari dormitory, the subsequent occupation of Willard Straight Hall by members of the Afro-American Society in 1969 and the alleged arson at the Africana Studies and Research Center in 1970. That same year, he was admitted to the New York State bar as a licensed architect.

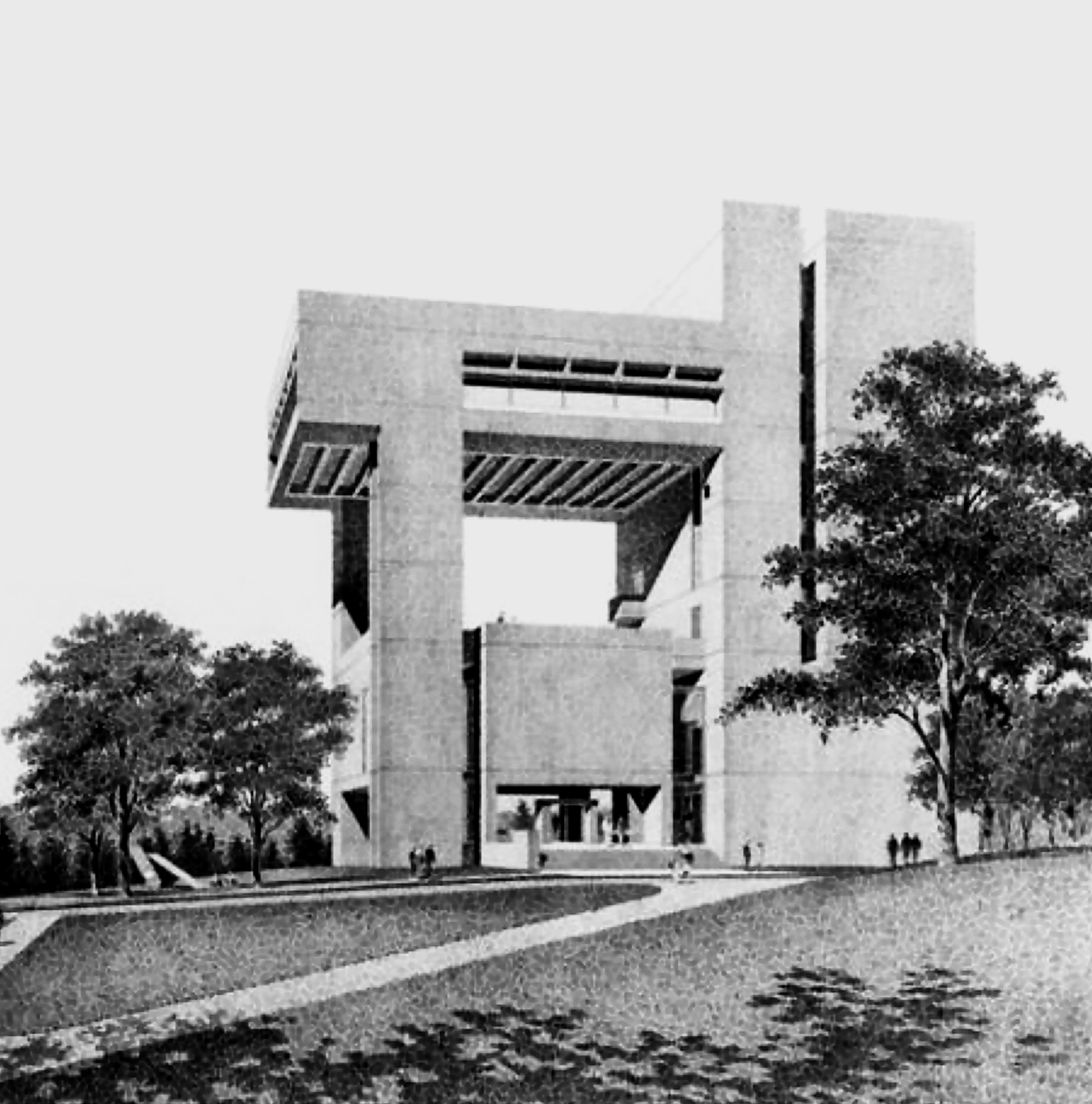
Herbert F. Johnson Museum, rendering for the Finger Lakes Region Tourism website

In response to the dismissal of four assistant professors (Alan Chimacoff, Fred Koetter, Jerry Wells, and Roger Sherwood) by then-Dean Oswald Mathias Ungers for ideological reasons, Herdeg resigned from his professorship and was established in 1973 by Dean James Polshek to the Columbia University Graduate School of Architecture, Planning and Preservation.

In May 1973 The Cornell Daily Sun published a review by Alan Chimacoff and Klaus Herdeg of the Herbert F. Johnson Museum of Art, designed by I.M. Pei: It is the totem-like disproportion of the building that has led people to view it at times as a gigantic throne, at times as a monumental altar, at times as a colossal Chinese character, or as a giant’s toy that has tumbled out of the Arts Quad … and if the Johnson Museum is totem-like but lacks corresponding meaning, then its appearance of power is an empty one. In other words: The absence of meaning leads to the irresponsible use of the symbolism of power. The question of whether it is appropriate to use a museum as a symbol of power naturally belongs to a different category of considerations.

In 1974, he published together with Michel Dennis, the brochure “Urban Precedents", a collection compiled by students of 36 Figure-ground plans of European cities, significant historic buildings, and three American campuses.

That same year, Herdeg was selected by the New York Landmarks Conservancy to serve as a consultant on a project to preserve and repurpose the Federal Office Building in New York—also known as the Federal Archive Building in Greenwich Village. His work on the project was later published in 1976 in a book titled Working Paper 1: Creative Analysis for the Reprogramming of Landmarks.

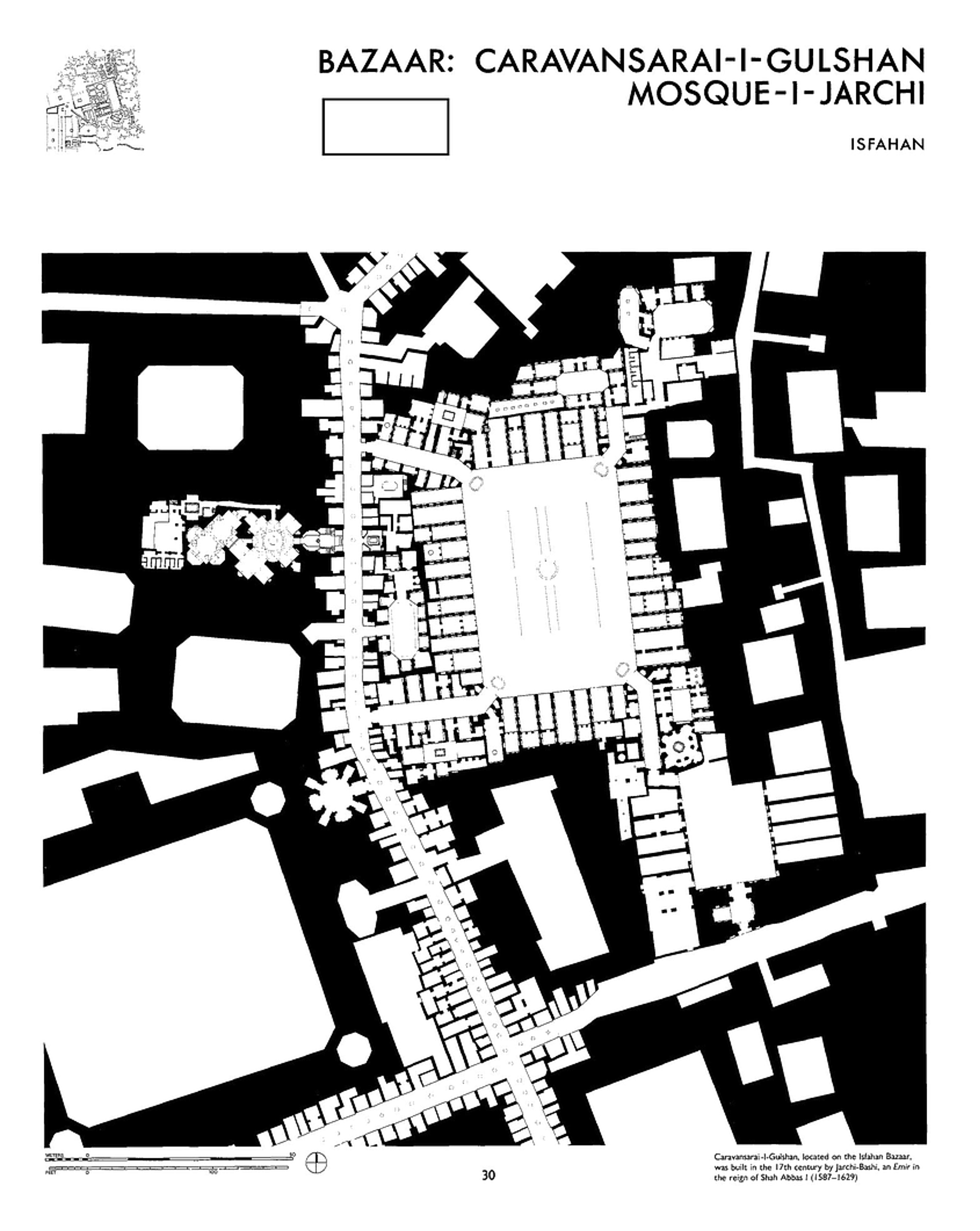
Figure-Ground plan of the I-Gulshan Caravanserai in the Isfahan Bazaar

Before beginning his teaching position at Columbia University, Herdeg lectured at various schools (Princeton, MIT, RISD and the ETH Zurich) and travelled to Iran and present-day Uzbekistan in 1975 with funding from the Wheelwright Prize awarded by the Harvard Graduate School of Design. Herdeg’s work in the Middle East and the former Soviet Union on Islamic architecture was featured in another traveling exhibition and published in 1990 under the title "Formal Structure in Islamic Architecture of Iran and Turkistan."

At Columbia University, Herdeg taught various design classes as well as courses on Indian and Islamic architecture. He also initiated a student exchange program with Tianjin University, which was launched in 1982. The program stemmed from an unsolicited invitation that Dean Polshek had received from Tianjin University, which sparked the idea of an architectural exchange between the two universities. Polshek delegated responsibility for developing and organizing the program to Herdeg, who had traveled to Kashgar and other locations in mainland China in 1980 as part of an expedition led by the Aga Khan. Through these trips, which were supported by the Asian Cultural Council, Herdeg developed an interest in Chinese architecture of the Concession era, following his earlier studies of Indian and Islamic architecture. From this period, he produced a series of large-format drawings of significant early 20th-century buildings in Tianjin.

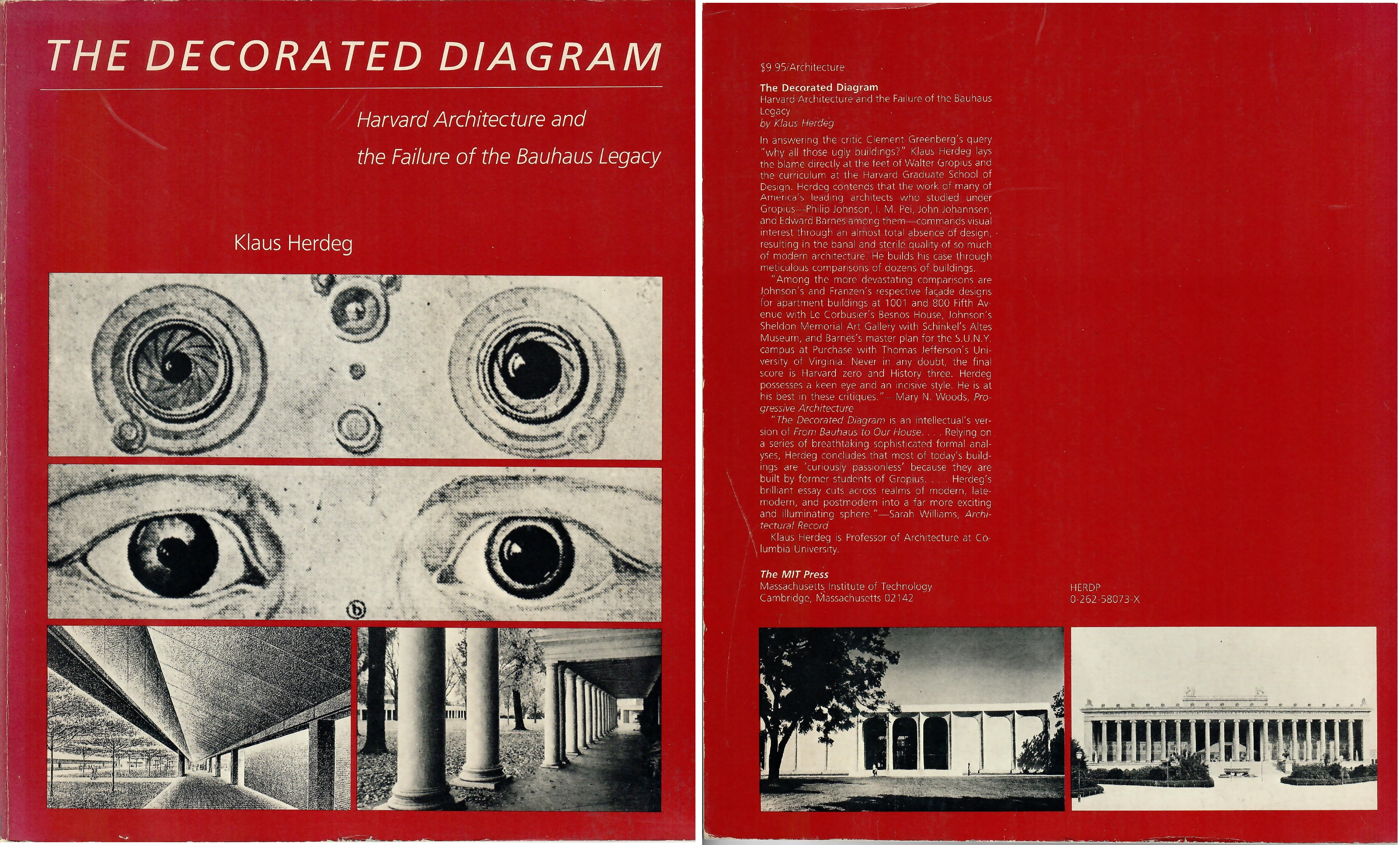
Klaus Herdeg, book cover (1983)

In 1984, Herdeg was appointed chair of the Department of Architecture at Columbia University. A year earlier, his book The Decorated Diagram was published. (German: “Die Geschmückte Formel") in which he condemned the teaching method established by Gropius and built upon his critique of an abstract and banal modernism, as he had already expressed 10 years earlier at the Herbert F. Johnson Museum: "It's as if scales have fallen from one's eyes when comparing Le Corbusier's Errazuriz House (1930) and Breuer’s Exhibition House (1949) at the Museum of Modern Art." Both featuring butterfly roofs, one reveals itself as an original three-dimensional creative achievement born of the confrontation between abstract form and a craftsman’s understanding of architecture (Corbusier), while the other appears as an epigonal conformity to the spirit of the times, based on an efficient floor plan diagram laden with modern references. Celebrated works by prominent architects are skillfully passed through this analytical-typological filter so that, as in the case of I.M. Pei’s Johnson Museum, they are exposed down to the last detail as banal totems whose promise remains unfulfilled.” (Translated excerpt, book review in Der Architekt, Association of German Architects Issue 3/1987)

“Public and Private Buildings in Islamic Cities” was presented in 1987 as a photo exhibition of Herdeg’s travels at Avery Hall. In the summer of 1989, Herdeg returned with his New York architecture students to the most significant sites in Central Asia that he had visited in 1975 for his research on “Formal Structures in Islamic Architecture of Iran and Turkestan.”

In the fall of 1993, the Arthur Ross Architecture Gallery in Buell Hall at Columbia University hosted an exhibition on Herdeg’s father, the Swiss photographer Hugo Herdeg, who received little attention in the United States.

Klaus W. Herdeg died on February 21, 2009, in New York City after a long illness. He is survived by three sons: Kenneth, John Paul, and Kay Herdeg.

A posthumous exhibition was held in 2011 at the “Center for Architecture” at the AIA New York, focusing on historic Stepwells — water collection systems and cultural gathering places — which Herdeg was the first to recognize as monuments of architectural significance in his research work “Formal Structures in Indian Architecture” (1967).

== Publications ==
- Herdeg, Klaus; Dennis, Michel (1974). Urban Precedents. Ithaca: Arnold Printing Company.
- —— (1983). The Decorated Diagram – Harvard Architecture & Failure of the Bauhaus Legacy: Harvard Architecture and the Failure of the Bauhaus Legacy. Cambridge, MA: MIT Press. ISBN 0-26208-127-X.
- —— (1988). Die Geschmückte Formel - Harvard: Das Bauhaus-Erbe und sein amerikanischer Verfall (in German). Frankfurt: DAM. ISBN 3-528-08700-5.
- —— (1990). Formal Structure in Islamic Architecture of Iran and Turkistan. New York: Rizzoli. ISBN 0-84781-049-6.
- —— (1991). Formal Structure In Indian Architecture. New York: Rizzoli. ISBN 0-84781-048-8.
