= Nagar Sagar Kund =

- सागर कुंद
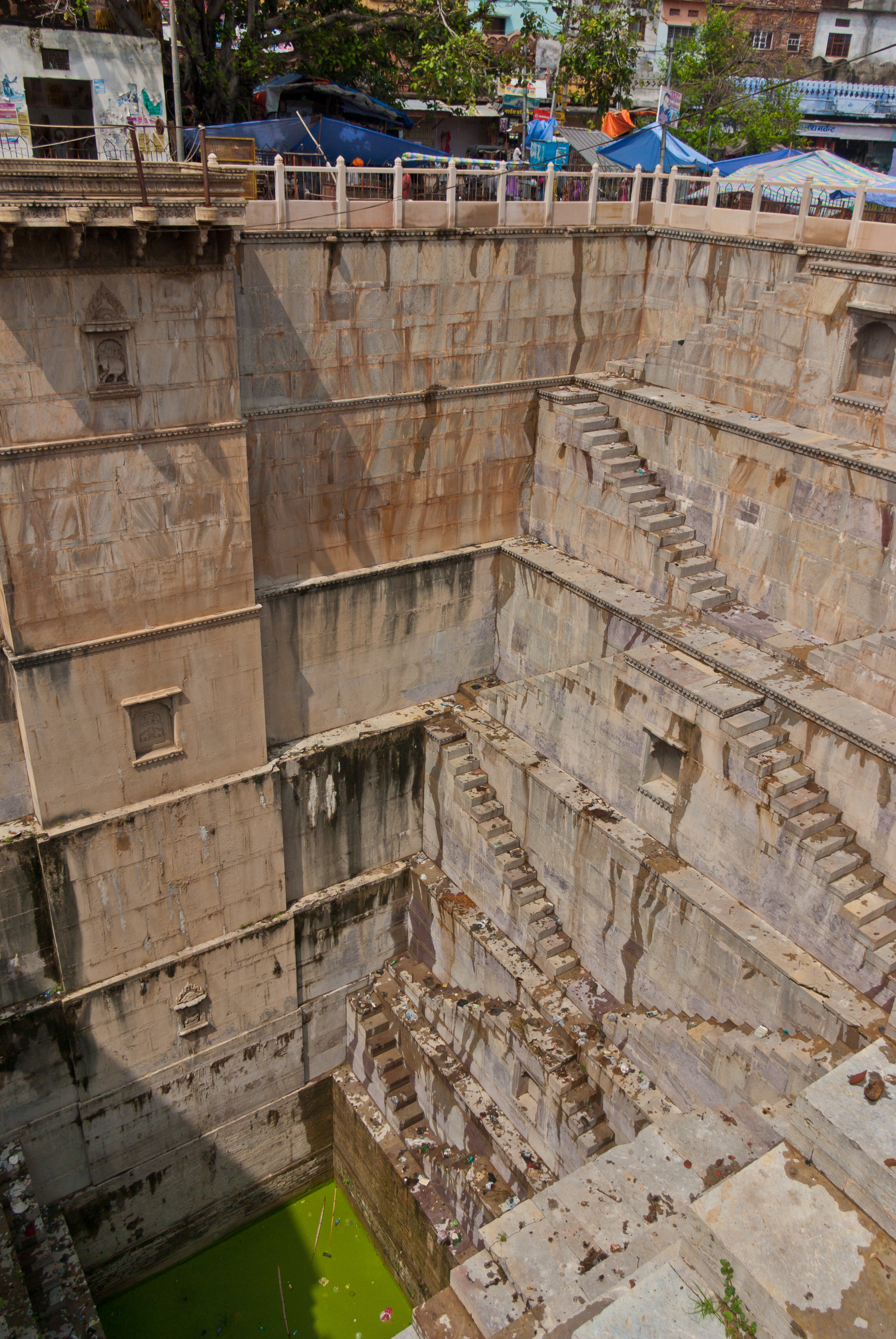
- Eastern stepwell
- 25.442197°N 75.639764°E
- Location: Bundi, Rajasthan, India
- Type: Stepwell
- Material: white sandstone

The Nagar Sagar Kund are twin stepwells in the city of Bundi, Rajasthan, India. Located near the Raniji Ki Baori stepwell and decorated with sculptures, they are no longer in use to this day.

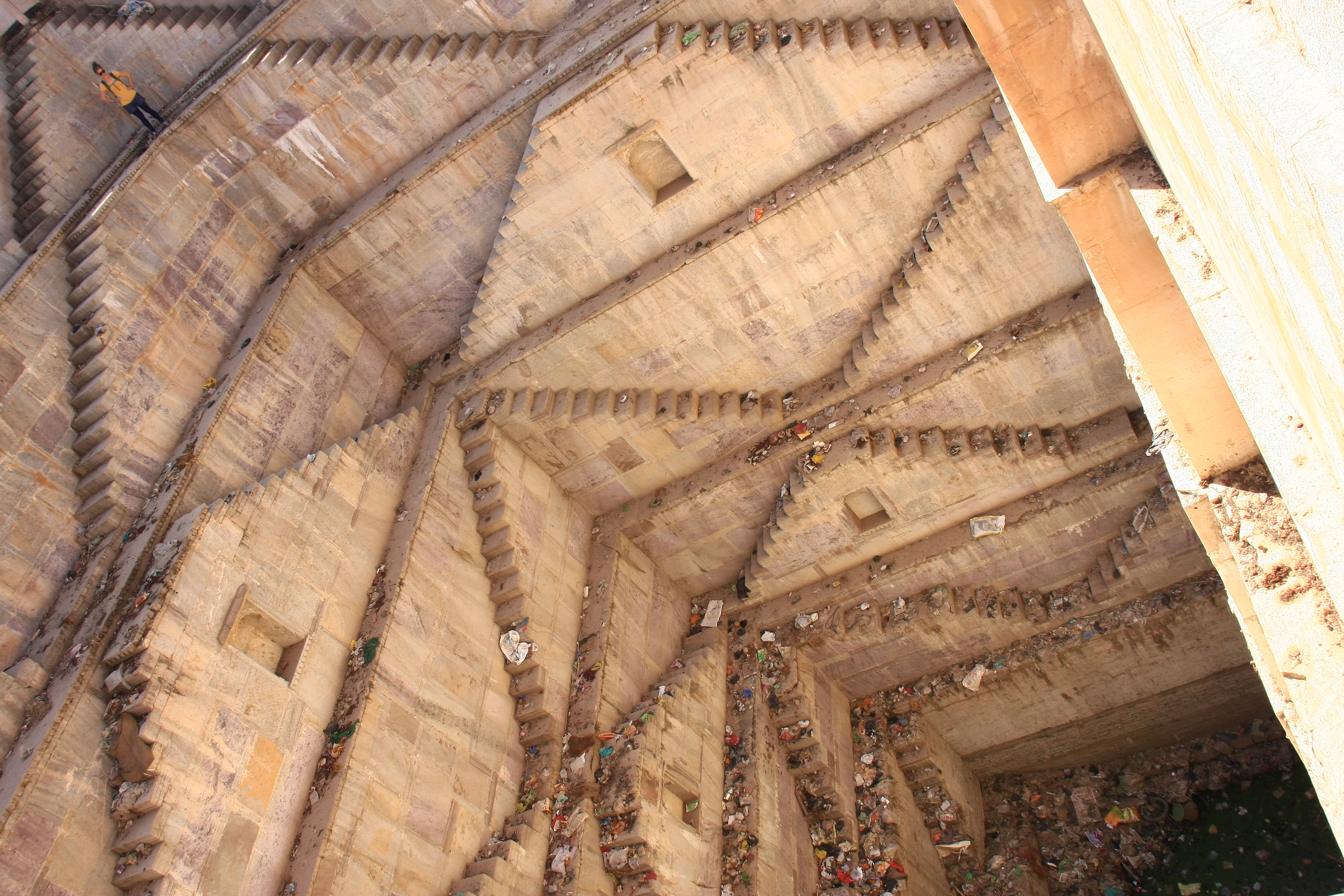
Western stepwell
