= Vanarashi Vav =

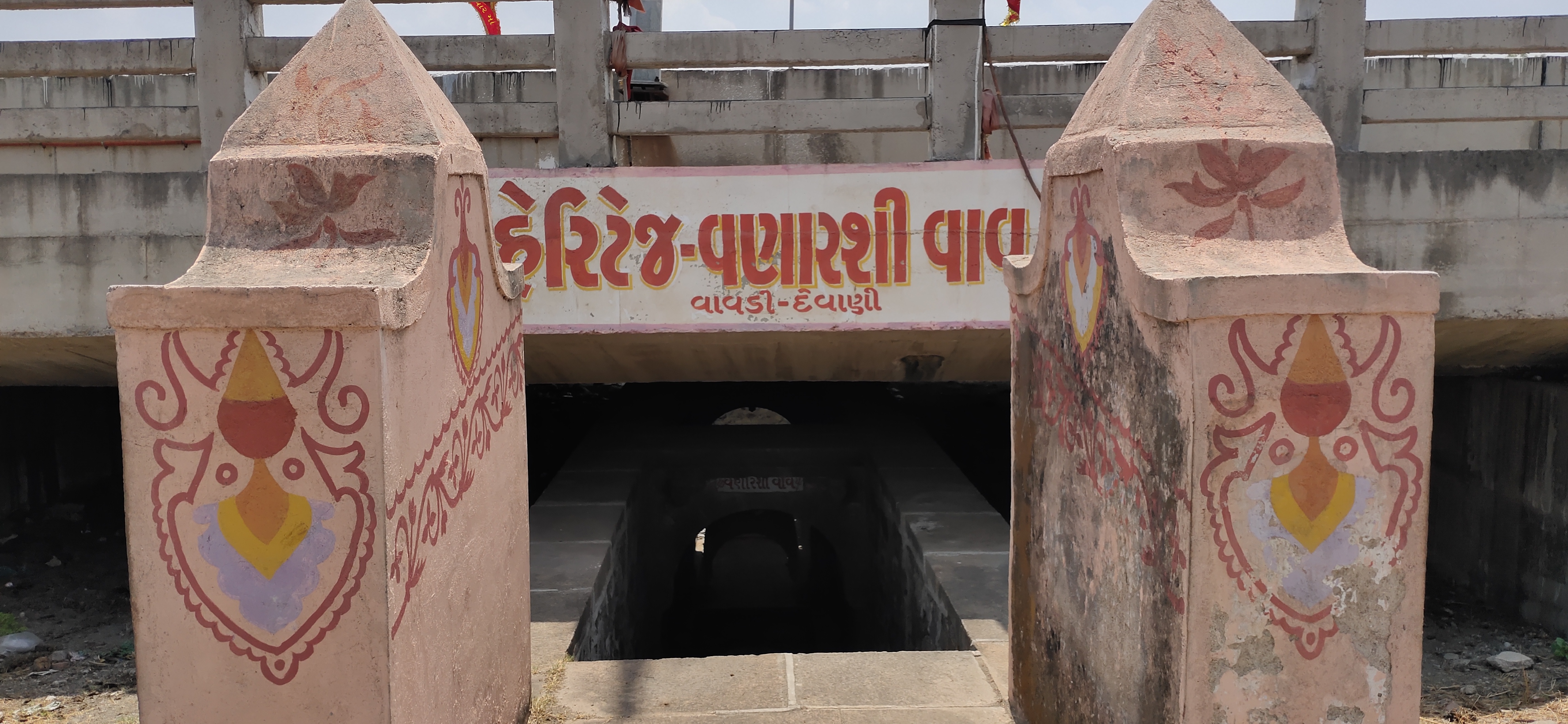
- Entrance
- Interactive map of the Vanarashi Vav area

General information
- Architectural style: Indian architecture
- Location: Vavdi, Ghogha Taluka, Bhavnagar district, Gujarat, India
- Coordinates: 21.543883°N 72.124233°E
- Completed: 1902

Design and construction
- Architect: Local

Vanarashi Vav is a stepwell located near Vavdi village of Ghogha Taluka, Bhavnagar district, Gujarat, India. Built in 1902, it was restored in 2019.

== History ==
The stepwell has following inscription: This Vanarashi Vav was built in Samvat 1958, Falgun Vad 5, Saturday (1902 AD), during the reign of Vavdi ruler Devani Nathubhai Godadbhai. It was built by Maganlal and Parmananddas, sons of Late Vanarashi Jadavji, for virtue of their father. He was a resident of Bhavnagar, Kapol Vanik by caste and of Munja Amravala family.

In 2018, the stepwell was proposed to be buried for the construction of the Bhavnagar-Veraval Highway. Following protest and opposition by villagers for one and half year, it was saved and a bridge was built over it. It was restored and inaugurated by Vijayrajsinh Gohil, linked to former rulers of erstwhile Bhavnagar State, on 19 May 2019, Sunday.

== Architecture ==
The stepwell is constructed in east–west direction; the entrance is in the west while the well is in the east.

It has carvings and arches.

== Gallery ==
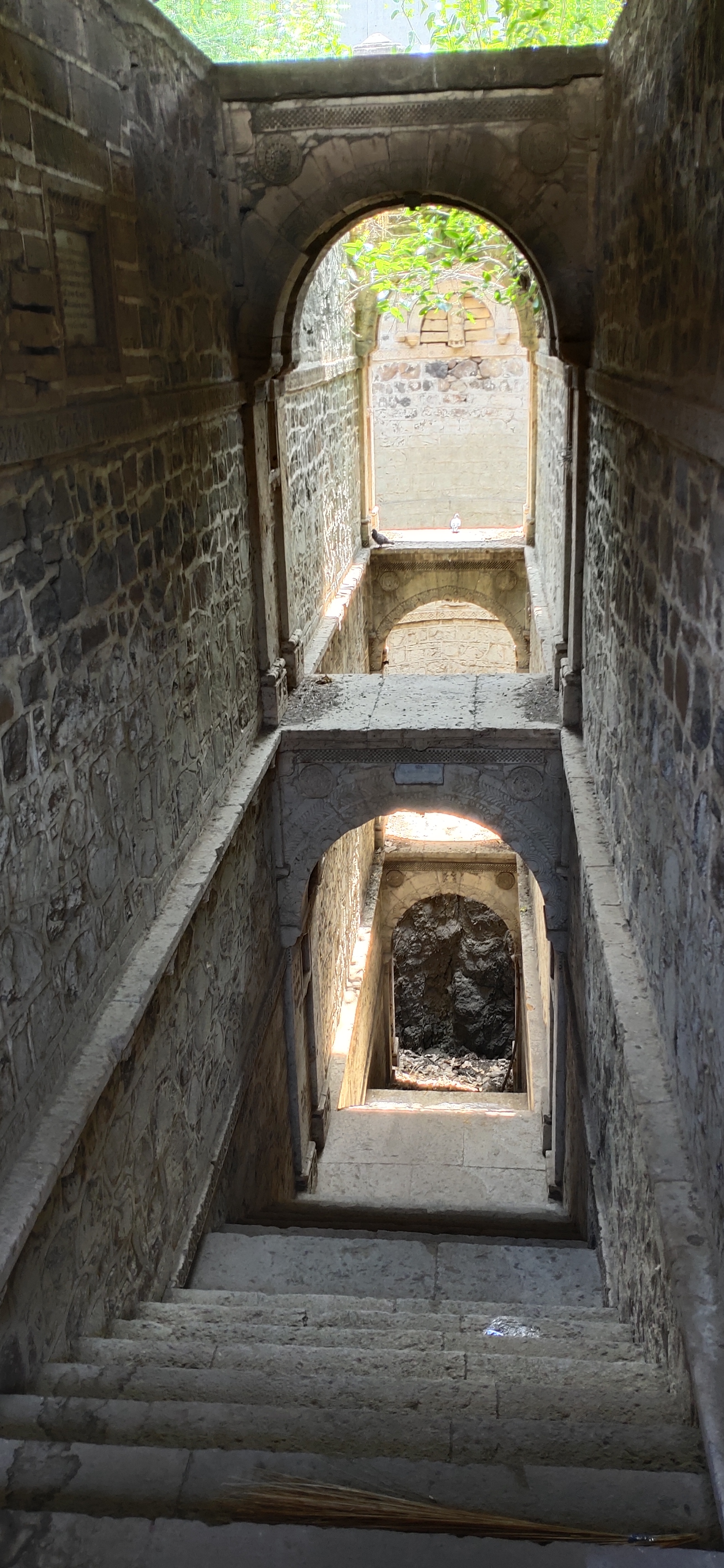
Inside the stepwell

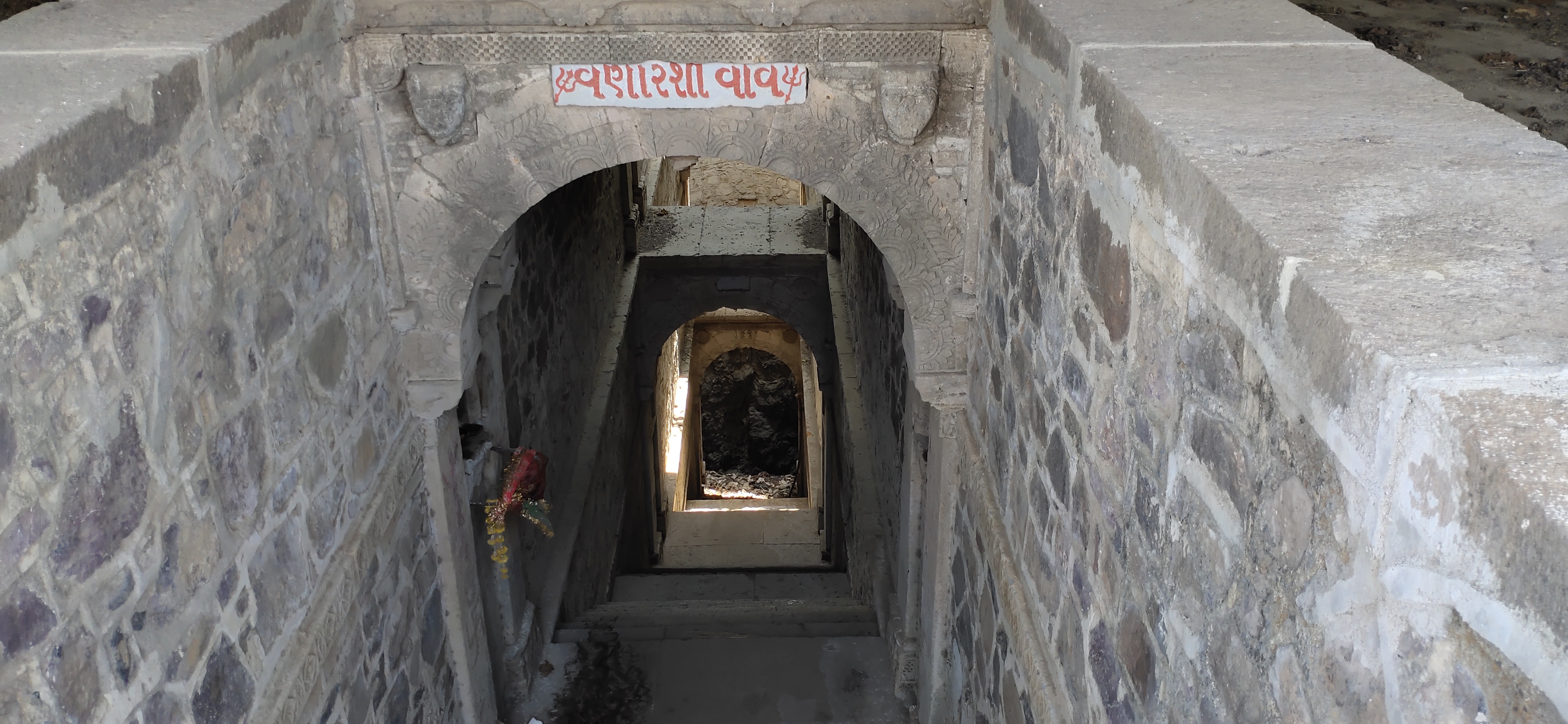
At first landing in the stepwell

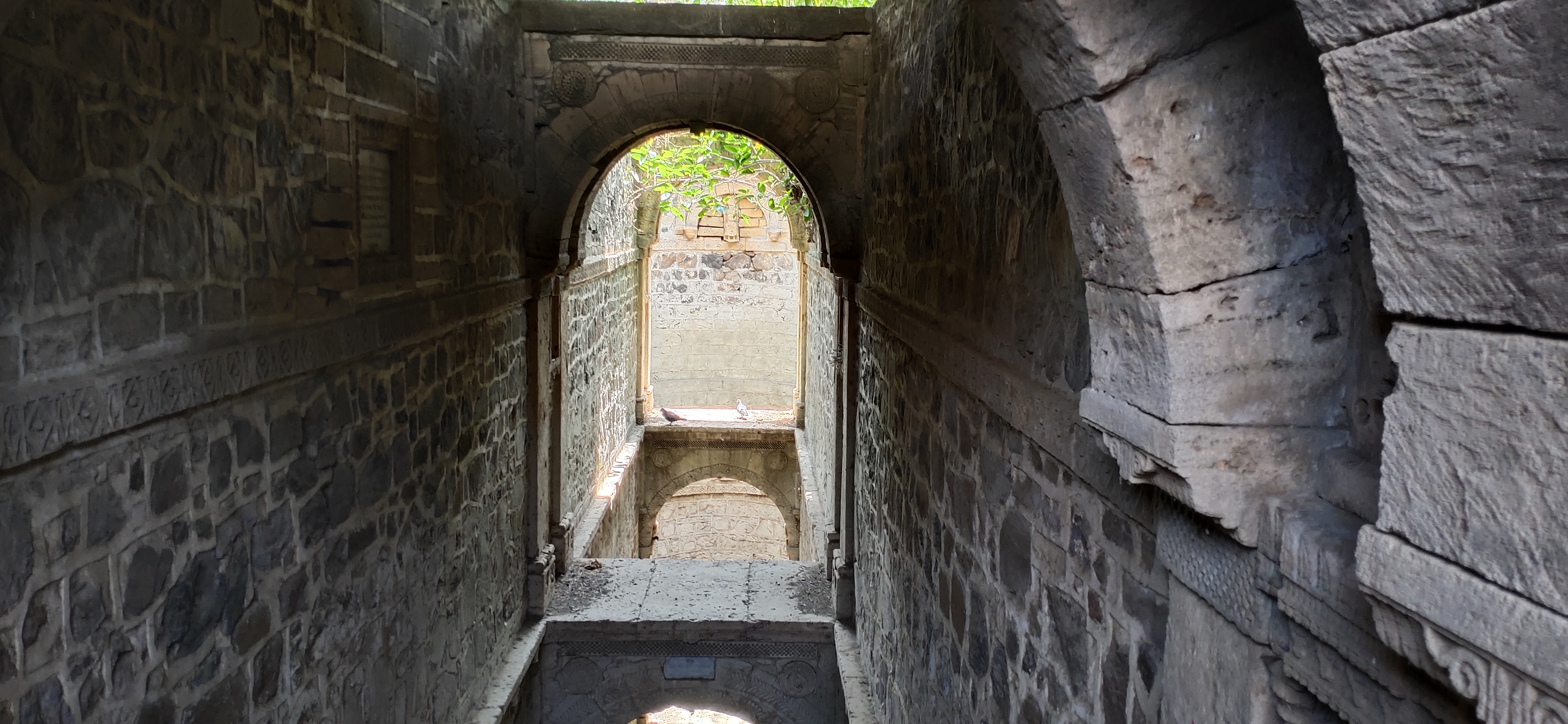
Arches
