= Udoji ki Baori =

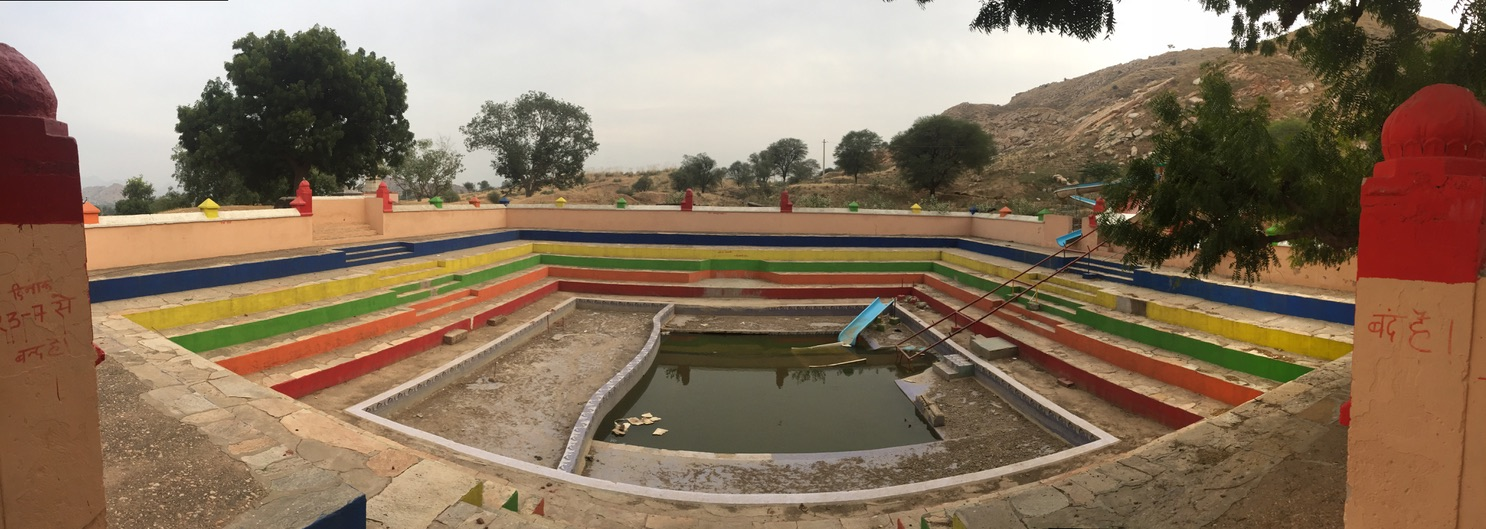
Udoji ki Baori Mandholi

Udoji ki Baori is a stepwell situated in the village of Mandholi in the Indian state of Rajasthan.

== Overview ==
Mandholi is a village in the Sikar district of Rajasthan state in India. It is situated 90 km to the north of Jaipur.

It is located opposite Sati Mata Temple and was constructed around AD 1500.
