= Birkha Bawari =

Stepwell in Jodhpur, India

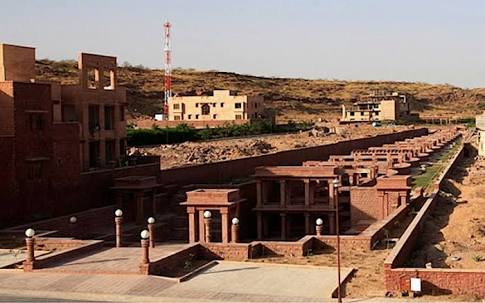
- Birkha Bawari, Jodhpur
- Interactive map of the Birkha Bawari area

General information
- Location: Jodhpur, Rajasthan, India

Design and construction
- Architect: Anu Mridul
- Awards and prizes: All India Stone Architecture Award (2009)

Other information
- Seating capacity: 17.5 million liters

The Birkha Bawari is a stepwell located in Jodhpur, India. The structure is to designed to conserve water for use by the city of Jodhpur, and is built in the style traditional Indian stepwells. It was designed by Indian architect Anu Mridul and was paid for by the Essgee Group, a real estate firm based in Jodhpur.

== Design history ==
Stepwells were constructed to capture and hold rainwater for agricultural and domestic use. The water reserves stored by stepwells aided in conserving water during long periods of drought. Throughout its history, the city of Jodhpur was supplied with water from over 50 stepwells. However, the introduction of low cost pumps and pipes rendered stepwells obsolete, and none were built after the 19th century.

The Brikha Bawari was designed in the style of older stepwells. The stepwell was designed at the behest of the Essgee Group, a Jodhpur-based real estate firm, which envisioned a modern stepwell as a source of water for a new housing development it was constructing. The firm contracted Anu Mridul to design the modern stepwell. Construction on the building was finished in 2009, after which the stepwell began to be used as a water reservoir. Mridul was awarded the All India Stone Architecture Award in 2009 for his design.

The stepwell is built of red sandstone, and is capable of holding 17.5 million liters of rainwater. The stepwell currently provides water for the Umaid Heritage Housing Township, a housing development built by the Essgee Group.
