= Bahar Wali Boali =

Bahar Wali Baoli
- بہار والی باولی

General information
- Location: Kharian, Gujrat District, Punjab, Pakistan
- Completed: Mughal period (c. 17th century, reign of Aurangzeb)

Technical details
- Material: Stone

Bahar Wali Baoli (also spelled Bahar Wali Bawli) is a historical stepwell located in Kharian, within the Gujrat District of Punjab, Pakistan. Rooted in Mughal-era architecture, the baoli served as a vital source of water and a social utility for the local community.

== Etymology ==
The word baoli (also spelled bawli or bawri) is derived from Persian, referring to a well constructed with a descending series of steps to access water at different levels.

== History ==
Bahar Wali Baoli is believed to have been constructed during the Mughal period, possibly under the reign of Akbar. The baoli is built entirely of stone, with multiple chambers designed to maintain cool water temperatures during hot summers.

== Architecture ==
The structure reflects traditional Mughal subterranean architecture, similar in concept to stepwells in western India. Its design combines utilitarian engineering—ensuring water accessibility and quality—with the aesthetic sensibilities of the period.

== Conservation ==
The Directorate General of Archaeology Punjab led the conservation, restoration, and preservation of Bahar Wali Baoli, describing it as a successful heritage project.

According to Dawn, the centuries-old baoli in Kharian was rehabilitated by the archaeology department beginning in 2021. The Punjab government approved the restoration project following demands from civil society, allocating Rs10 million for the work in the fiscal year. Excavation at the site revealed at least 25 feet of depth, with experts estimating the total depth of the well to be between 70 and 80 feet.

Restoration efforts included manual excavation to protect the structure, reopening the entrance and one arch, and installing protective steel railings. The site, covering over two kanals, had long suffered neglect and encroachments, which were cleared by the district administration before conservation began.

== Legacy ==
Today, Bahar Wali Baoli stands as a symbol of Mughal engineering and communal heritage in Punjab. It attracts historians, conservationists, and tourists, offering insights into historical water management practices and architectural styles.

== See also ==
- Stepwell
