= Maonda =

Village in Rajasthan, India

Coordinates: 27°48′50″N 75°52′36″E

Maonda, is a small village located on the Neem-Ka-Thana to Khetri road Rajasthan, India. The village consists three small areas (Maonda khurd, Maonda kalan and Maonda Railway Station). It is directly connected with Delhi, Mumbai, Ajmer, Chandigarh by train, some of the major cities close to it include Sikar Alwar, Jaipur, Rohtak, and Hisar .

== Natural resources ==
The Maonda area is rich with deposits of marble, calcite, limestone. The area is located in the Sikar District of the state of Rajasthan with latitude 27°48'50"N and longitude 75°52'36"E. The Tehsil (administrative division, aka. Taluka) of Maonda is Nimkathanah.

The area experiences an extreme climate with hot seasons. Average rainfall reaches its peak in the month of July at 222 millimeters. Months from January to May and October to December are extremely dry.

== Geographical location ==
Maonda can be reached via State Highway 666 Rajasthan, an Indian state in the Northwestern zone.

Elevation is 416 m.

== History ==
In 1767, the Jats of Bharatpur and Rajputs of Jaipur fought against each other in the Battle of Maonda and Mandholi. Two brothers named Shyamdas Ji and Sunderdas Ji, moved from Gaonri, a nearby village, and founded the village of Maonda, These brothers became pastoral landowners.

Three generations of the Rajawats of Dhula perished in the battle of Maonda and Mandholi.
