= Battle of Maonda and Mandholi =

War between Jat-ruled Bharatpur and Kachawaha territory of Jaipur

Coordinates: 27°46′N 75°48′E

Maonda Mandholi War
Date	14 December 1767
Location	Mandholi, Rajasthan
Result	Jaipur victory

Belligerents
Kingdom of Jaipur	Kingdom of Bharatpur

Commanders and leaders
Madho Singh	Jawahar Singh

Strength
16,000 horsemen and infantry	Unknown

Casualties and losses
2,000–3,000	2,000–3,000

The Battle of Maonda and Mandholi was fought between the Rajput rulers of Jaipur and the Jat rulers of Bharatpur in 1767 in Rajasthan. Jawahar Singh of Bharatpur was leading an army back from Pushkar when the forces of Madho Singh of Jaipur met them by Maonda and Mandholi villages, near present-day Neem ka Thana. The battle resulted in the rout of the Bharatpur army by the Jaipur forces.

== Background ==
Suraj Mal had been a loyal ally to the house of Jaipur. He used to visit Jai Singh II every Dussehra and present gifts to him, and whenever Jai Singh passed through Bharatpur territory Surajmal would wait upon him and feed the Jaipur troops and then lay the keys of his forts before Jai Singh as Suraj Mal used to consider him, his Father. Jai Singh also favoured the Bharatpur Raja and secured a province worth five lakh rupees a year for him. These good relations continued till Surajmal's death.

Upon Suraj Mal's death, his successor, Jawahar Singh, was very proud of the wealth and soldiers that he had inherited from his father. Jawahar Singh's army was trained and led by Europeans like Madec and Samru and consisted of 15,000 cavalry, 25,000 infantry (excluding the garrisons) and 300 pieces of artillery. With the number of troops at his disposal, he did not find a need for a continued alliance with Madho Singh, the son of Jai Singh and then Raja of Jaipur. The hostility between the Rajas of Bharatpur and Jaipur continued to grow.

Jawahar Singh, ruler of Bharatpur state, had earlier defeated his step brother Nahar Singh, who escaped to take refuge in Jaipur state. Nahar poisoned himself, leaving his widow behind in Jaipur. Jawahar demanded Nahar's widow, described by Jadunath Sarkar as one of the most beautiful women on earth. But the lady refused, fearing Jawahar's character as Jawahar Singh wanted to take her in his harem and Madho Singh could not forcibly expel an asylum seeker. This resulted in Jawahar becoming furious. Further Jawahar was also keeping his eyes upon the Narnol district, which was a territory of Jaipur state. Jawahar Singh along with his Sikh mercenaries had made several incursions into the Jaipur state and their unchecked aggression made Madho Singh intrigue against Jawahar and the Bharatpur state.

In 1767, Jawahar Singh marched through Jaipur territory with his whole army along with French trained battalions and artillery guns to reach Pushkar. There, he met with the ruler of Marwar state; Vijay Singh and an agreement was signed between them to oust the Marathas, who were raiding in Rajputana following their defeat at the hands of Ahmed Shah Abdali in 1761.

This meeting between the two was not liked by Madho Singh. According to Jadunath Sarkar, Madho Singh reprimanded Vijay Singh for sitting equally with Jawahar Singh, whom he considered a mere peasant and a servant of Jaipur.

== Battle ==
Jawahar thus attacked and plundered the villages of Jaipur and molested its villagers in revenge while returning from Pushkar. The Kachwaha army followed and attacked forces of Bharatpur at Mandholi, which was the last station of the Jaipur state and was located near to the frontiers of Bharatpur state. The Jaipur artillery had lagged behind, causing their first attack to be repulsed by the Bharatpur army. Jats, hoping to escape from the battlefield, entered a narrow pass ahead of them. In the middle of the pass, the Kachwaha cavalry overtook them. Jaipur forces stood firmly against the guns of Bharatpur and finally threw themselves, with swords in hand, onto Jat army. The Jat army fled with the first shock of Jaipur cavalry abandoning their baggage and artillery which was captured by Jaipur forces. With the rest of Singh's army dispersed, the French sepoys of Samru and Madec saved Jawahar Singh and enabled him to retreat into his territory. The royal umbrella of Jawahar Singh was also abandoned in the battlefield along with their baggage and artillery.

== Result ==
The Bharatpur army thus retreated into their territory after being defeated in the fierce battle which resulted in heavy casualties on both sides, death toll supposedly reaching 5,000. The soldiers of Bharatpur abandoned their artillery and royal standards, including the royal umbrella of their king. According to Sarkar, the Jaipur army lost most of their important generals with death toll on their side reaching 2000–3000. This had happened due to the superior artillery of Bharatpur and the presence of French led sepoys of Samru and Madec, on the other hand Kachwaha artillery and infantry was lagging behind. According to some sources Jawahar Singh's defeat is ascribed to him insulting the Jaipur Raja by not intimating him about his motive while tresspasing through his territory. It is why the Rajputs attacked Jawahar Singh and defeated him. According to Rima Hooja, Pratap Singh Naruka led the Jaipur forces to victory against Jawahar Singh.

== Aftermath ==
Madho Singh then decided to invade Bharatpur in order to follow up his victory. Madho Singh again defeated Jawahar Singh at the Kama. Madho Singh later retreated to his state due to the arrival of fresh contingent of 20,000 Sikh mercenaries, employed by Jawahar Singh for seven Lakh a month. The fortune of Jats was shaken in the battle and the result had been fatal to them. They returned home pillaged, stupefied and overthrown. The land beyond Chambal (recently conquered by Jawahar Singh) rose after the first report of the rout. His own country was the prey of enemy who followed him close. Madho Singh died in the following year due to illness from the fatigue of the campaign. On the other hand Jawahar Singh was assassinated by one of his own trusted servicemen.
