= Torawati =

Torawati (also known as Tanwarawati or Toravati) was a small chieftainship whose rulers claimed to be direct descendants of Anangpal II, a Tomar Rajput ruler. Southern part of Jhunjhunu district, eastern and south-eastern part of Sikar district and some northern parts of Jaipur district are called Torawati. Hence the dialect here was called Torawati. Anangpal established the city of Patan during his rule in the 12th century AD and Torawati was governed from there. The region consisted of some 380 villages spread over 3000 sq kilometres.
