= Mandholi =

Mandholi Mandoli
- town
- Location in Rajasthan, India Mandholi (India)
- Coordinates: 27.77°N 75.8°E
- Country: India
- State: Rajasthan
- District: Sikar

Government
  - Body: Gram Panchayat
- Elevation: 300 m (980 ft)

Population (2001)
  - Total: 1,500

Languages
  - Official: Hindi
- Time zone: UTC+5:30 (IST)
- PIN: 332713
- Telephone code: 09928475455,9711524281
- Vehicle registration: RJ23
- Nearest city: Neem ka thana
- Literacy: 70%
- Lok Sabha constituency: Sikar
- Vidhan Sabha constituency: Neemkathana
- Civic agency: Gram Panchayat
- Website: www.sikar.in

Mandholi is a small town of about 1500 people in eastern Rajasthan. It is 5 km from Neem ka thana township and about 90 km from Jaipur. It is famous for Battle of Maonda and Mandholi

== History ==
Mandholi was part of Virat Janpad, and was ruled by tribal Meena rulers since antiquity, they were forced out of power by Jat rulers who were defeated by Tanwar Rajputs - Lakhaji Tanwar and Sangaji Tanwar, about 1567 A.D. Mandholi was part of state of Patan Torawati. This seat of power were elder house of Patan rulers. In mid eighteenth century the Battle of Maonda and Mandholi was fought in the plains surrounding villages of Maonda and Mandholi between Rajput forces of Jaipur-Amer and Jat forces of Bharatpur. About 25000 people lost their lives in this battle.

== Mandholi Fort ==
The old fort at Mandholi is located exactly North of Jaipur's Nahargarh fort and on a good day, is visible with naked eye. In old days it was used as a fire warning structure also. The fort was held by Tanwar Rajputs since the 16th century but before that it belonged to Jats (Jakhar) and before that Meena rulers of the area held the Mandholi fort.

=== Structure ===
The fort is a three-story structure with four gumbaj (circular pillars). The underground room is safest and used for storage; the main floor had five rooms with circular pillars in four directions to cover any enemy attack. The top floor was for observation and additional provisions and people.

=== Hindal's attack on Amarsar Shekhawati ===
Humayun's brother was sent to curb the Shekhawats of the area who refused Mughal suzerainty, the Torawati forces joined the Shekhawati forces and a battle was fought in this area.

=== Battle of Maonda and Mandholi ===
The last action witnessed by this fort was the battle of Maonda and Mandholi where the Jaipur state forces were pitched against the Jat rulers of Bharatpur. The Thakur of Maonda village was the fort authority in this battle.

=== Bheruji Temple ===
The Mandholi fort like most other forts in the area has a temple dedicated to the deity Bhairav (Bheruji).Up until a decade back goat sacrifice was a common sight at this fort.

=== Durga Mata Temple ===
There is a temple for Durga Maa on the rocky mountain in the village. People are often seen hiking on mountain for adrenaline rush and to visit the temple.

=== Gopalji Temple ===
Dedicated to Lord Krishna

=== Sita Ramji Temple ===
Dedicated to Lord Ram and Sitaji

=== Udoji ki Baori ===
A step well in typical style seen across Rajasthan, situated in the lathati or bottom area of the hill. It was renovated recently and converted as a water park.

=== Sati maata ===
Sati maata temple is situated next to the step well. Dedicated to Sati maata of Jakhar clan.

== Notable people ==
Tanwar Rajvansh Ka Itihas

1. Sati Maata - sacrificed herself to preserve the Jakhar progeny.
2. Thakur Lakha Singh and Thakur Sangram singh - won the mandholi fort from Jat rulers.
3. Thakur prahlad Singh Tanwar - a prominent educationist of the Torawati area.

== Affinity ==
Affiliated to erstwhile kingdom of PATAN Torawati.
