= List of State Protected Monuments in Gujarat =

This is a list of State Protected Monuments as officially reported by and available through the website of the Archaeological Survey of India in the Indian state Gujarat. The monument identifier is a combination of the abbreviation of the subdivision of the list (state, ASI circle) and the numbering as published on the website of the ASI.

362 State Protected Monuments have been recognized by the ASI in Gujarat including new monuments added by Gujarat State Archaeology and Museums Department on its website.

S-GJ-59 Timbo/Mound Dholavira is now N-GJ-202

S-GJ-105 Gupta Prayag, S-GJ-106 Gupta Prayag Kund and S-GJ-283 Khan Sarovar seem to be Delisted.

Besides the State Protected Monuments, also the Monuments of National Importance in this state might be relevant.

== List of state protected monuments ==
SL. No.	Description	Location	Address	District	Coordinates	Image
S-GJ-1	Amritavarshini Vav	Panchkuva	Ahmedabad	Ahmedabad	23°01′30″N 72°35′50″E	Amritavarshini Vav More images
S-GJ-2	Dutch Tomb	Near Kankaria Lake	Ahmedabad	Ahmedabad district	23°00′21″N 72°35′51″E	Dutch Tomb More images
S-GJ-3	Khan Talav Having Water Let out		Dholka	Ahmedabad district	22°44′03″N 72°25′43″E	Upload Photo
S-GJ-4	Ancient Masjid (Mosque)		Isanpur	Ahmedabad district	22°58′30″N 72°36′11″E	Upload Photo
S-GJ-5	Ancient Step Well		Kathvada	Ahmedabad district	23°03′28″N 72°42′17″E	Ancient Step Well More images
S-GJ-6	Timbo (Mound)	Sonpari	Babra	Amreli District	21°30′17″N 71°50′39″E	Upload Photo
S-GJ-7	Adnath Temple		Adpokar	Gir Somnath	20°51′05″N 70°47′27″E	Upload Photo
S-GJ-8	Two inscriptions of Kandhamard Dada Temple		Juni Fafani (Near Dolasa)	Gir Somnath	20°49′36″N 70°48′09″E	Upload Photo
S-GJ-9	Ganganath Mahadev Temple		Tosan	Gir Somnath		Upload Photo
S-GJ-10	Ancient Shiv Temple		Kasara	Banaskantha	23°54′42″N 71°54′48″E	Ancient Shiv Temple More images
S-GJ-11	Kumbheshwar Mahadev		Kumbhariya	Banaskantha	24°19′28″N 72°51′40″E	Kumbheshwar Mahadev More images
S-GJ-12	Temple No.1 Near Kantivas		Tarsang Forest	Banaskantha	24°05′58″N 72°48′15″E	Upload Photo
S-GJ-13	Temple No.2		Tarsang Forest	Banaskantha		Upload Photo
S-GJ-14	Temple No.3		Tarsang Forest	Banaskantha		Upload Photo
S-GJ-15	Temple No.4		Tarsang Forest	Banaskantha		Upload Photo
S-GJ-16	Temple No.5		Tarsang Forest	Banaskantha		Upload Photo
S-GJ-17	Temple No.6		Tarsang Forest	Banaskantha		Upload Photo
S-GJ-18	Temple No.1 (near Mahudi)		Tarsang Forest (Near Mahudi)	Banaskantha	24°06′23″N 72°48′45″E	Upload Photo
S-GJ-19	Temple No. 2		Tarsang Forest (Near Mahudi)	Banaskantha		Upload Photo
S-GJ-20	Temple No.3		Tarsang Forest (Near Mahudi)	Banaskantha		Upload Photo
S-GJ-21	Temple No.4		Tarsang Forest (Near Mahudi)	Banaskantha		Upload Photo
S-GJ-22	Stepwell		Hadad	Banaskantha	24°15′46″N 72°58′48″E	Upload Photo
S-GJ-23	Ancient Temple		Hadad	Banaskantha	24°15′53″N 72°58′40″E	Upload Photo
S-GJ-24	Muleshwar Mahadev Temple		Padan	Vav-Tharad	24°17′10″N 71°18′47″E	Upload Photo
S-GJ-25	Kapileshwar Mahadev Temple		Vav	Vav-Tharad	24°24′04″N 71°29′06″E	Upload Photo
S-GJ-26	Mithi Vav		Palanpur	Banaskantha	24°10′08″N 72°26′36″E	Mithi Vav More images
S-GJ-27	Zaloragadh Timbo/Mound		Zaloragadh (Radhanpur)	Patan		Upload Photo
S-GJ-28	Kadia Dungar Caves		Zazpor	Bharuch	21°40′25″N 73°16′20″E	Kadia Dungar Caves More images
S-GJ-29	Harpiya Timbo (Harappan Mound)		Budhel	Bhavnagar	21°40′57″N 72°09′33″E	Upload Photo
S-GJ-30	Ganga Chhatri		Bhavnagar	Bhavnagar	21°46′33″N 72°08′39″E	Ganga Chhatri More images
S-GJ-31	Carvings of old Darbargadh		Bhavnagar	Bhavnagar	21°46′43″N 72°08′43″E	Upload Photo
S-GJ-32	Bhavnath Temple		Bhavnagar	Bhavnagar	21°46′40″N 72°08′40″E	Upload Photo
S-GJ-33	Firangi Deval		Kalsar	Bhavnagar	21°07′17″N 71°53′53″E	Firangi Deval More images
S-GJ-34	Ceiling and Pictures on the wall, Gopnath temple		Talaja	Bhavnagar	21°12′36″N 72°06′29″E	Upload Photo
S-GJ-35	Brahma Kund		Sihor	Bhavnagar	21°42′29″N 71°57′38″E	Brahma Kund More images
S-GJ-36	Saat Sheri (Satsheri)		Sihor	Bhavnagar	21°42′22″N 71°57′54″E	Saat Sheri (Satsheri) More images
S-GJ-37	Minara		Loliyana	Bhavnagar	21°56′31″N 71°47′27″E	Upload Photo
S-GJ-38	Ancient Temple		Gundi	Bhavnagar	21°36′45″N 72°15′55″E	Upload Photo
S-GJ-39	Kund & Toran		Kapadvanj	Kheda	23°01′23″N 73°04′16″E	Upload Photo
S-GJ-40	Vav (Step Well) (Dholikui)		Kapadvanj	Kheda	23°01′24″N 73°04′18″E	Upload Photo
S-GJ-41	Vori Vav		Kapadvanj	Kheda	23°01′37″N 73°04′26″E	Upload Photo
S-GJ-42	Mota Todavali Vav		Vadthal	Kheda	22°51′35″N 72°57′26″E	Upload Photo
S-GJ-43	Vav (Step Well)		Mahemdavad	Kheda	22°49′33″N 72°45′25″E	Upload Photo
S-GJ-44	Bhadrakali Mata Stepwell		Umreth	Anand	22°42′07″N 73°07′01″E	Upload Photo
S-GJ-45	Bhadeshwar Temple		Anjar	Kutch	23°06′21″N 70°01′44″E	Bhadeshwar Temple More images
S-GJ-46	Pictures on the wall of Deputy Collector office (MacMurdo's Bungalow)		Anjar	Kutch	23°06′41″N 70°01′39″E	Pictures on the wall of Deputy Collector office (MacMurdo's Bungalow) More images
S-GJ-47	Shail Gufa (Cave) No.1		Deshalpar	Kutch	23°26′38″N 69°10′20″E	Upload Photo
S-GJ-48	Shail Gufa No.2		Deshalpar	Kutch	23°26′38″N 69°10′20″E	Upload Photo
S-GJ-49	Puareshwar Temple (At Puargadh NR Lakhedi)		Manjal	Kutch	23°15′26″N 69°23′01″E	Puareshwar Temple (At Puargadh NR Lakhedi) More images
S-GJ-50	Vadimedi (Shaiv Madh) (At Puargadh)		Manjal	Kutch	23°15′30″N 69°22′53″E	Upload Photo
S-GJ-51	Gates of Kanthkot		Kanthkot	Kutch	23°29′06″N 70°27′51″E	Gates of Kanthkot More images
S-GJ-52	Jain Temple		Kanthkot	Kutch	23°29′03″N 70°27′52″E	Upload Photo
S-GJ-53	Surya Temple		Kanthkot	Kutch	23°29′05″N 70°27′49″E	Upload Photo
S-GJ-54	Shiva Temple		Kera	Kutch	23°05′17″N 69°35′37″E	Shiva Temple More images
S-GJ-55	Ram Kund		Bhuj	Kutch	23°14′51″N 69°39′53″E	Ram Kund More images
S-GJ-56	Old Temple		Bhadreshwar	Kutch	22°54′43″N 69°54′02″E	Upload Photo
S-GJ-57	Eye No Dero Shiva Temple		Chitrod - Mevasa	Kutch	23°24′54″N 70°41′50″E	Upload Photo
S-GJ-58	Shai Gufao/Caves (Siyot Caves)		Near Juna Patgadh	Kutch	23°46′26″N 68°52′35″E	Upload Photo
S-GJ-59	Timbo/Mound Dholavira Now N-GJ-202			Kutch		Upload Photo
S-GJ-60	Mound of Pabhumath		Suvai	Kutch		Upload Photo
S-GJ-61	Mound of Shobharel	in Shobharel river basin, Khadir Island	NE of Chanpar village	Kutch		Upload Photo
S-GJ-62	Padhargadh		Near Puareshwar (Manjal)	Kutch	23°15′22″N 69°22′49″E	Upload Photo
S-GJ-63	Lakhpat Fort		Lakhpat	Kutch	23°49′25″N 68°46′48″E	Lakhpat Fort More images
S-GJ-64	Bhuvadeshwar Mahadev Temple		Bhuvad	Kutch	23°01′02″N 69°53′56″E	Bhuvadeshwar Mahadev Temple More images
S-GJ-65	Gurdwara		Lakhpat	Kutch	23°49′34″N 68°46′41″E	Gurdwara More images
S-GJ-66	Kirti Stambh (Deva Manek Stambh)		Machharda (Kalavad)	Jamnagar	22°05′08″N 70°19′47″E	Upload Photo
S-GJ-67	Ancient Temple Danteshwar Mahadev Mandir	Datrana	Datrana	Devbhumi Dwarka	22°11′43″N 69°24′49″E	Upload Photo
S-GJ-68	Shail Gufa of Alech Patan/Khapra Kodia		Patan (Jamjodhpur)	Jamnagar	21°49′04″N 70°01′44″E	Upload Photo
S-GJ-69	Mound (Amra)		Amra	Jamnagar	22°24′47″N 69°55′22″E	Upload Photo
S-GJ-70	Shiv Temple (Khimeshwar Mahadev)		Khimrana	Jamnagar	22°28′25″N 70°09′52″E	Upload Photo
S-GJ-71	Kotho (Bhujio)/Rampart		Jamnagar	Jamnagar	22°27′43″N 70°04′13″E	Kotho (Bhujio)/Rampart
S-GJ-72	Khambhalia Gate		Jamnagar	Jamnagar	22°27′39″N 70°04′16″E	Khambhalia Gate More images
S-GJ-73	Inscription of Juma Masjid		Jamnagar	Jamnagar	22°27′48″N 70°04′44″E	Upload Photo
S-GJ-74	Nagnath Temple		Jamnagar	Jamnagar	22°28′46″N 70°05′06″E	Upload Photo
S-GJ-75	Lakhota Tower		Jamanagar	Jamnagar	22°27′53″N 70°04′10″E	Lakhota Tower More images
S-GJ-76	Mound (Narmana)		Narmana	Jamnagar	22°05′24″N 70°09′08″E	Upload Photo
S-GJ-77	Mound (Bed)		Bed	Jamnagar	22°26′49″N 69°53′57″E	Upload Photo
S-GJ-78	Mound (Moda)		Moda	Jamnagar	22°26′15″N 70°16′48″E	Upload Photo
S-GJ-79	Mound (Lakhabaval)		Lakhabawal	Jamnagar	22°25′13″N 69°59′37″E	Upload Photo
S-GJ-80	Mound (Vasai)		Vasai	Jamnagar	22°04′00″N 70°00′00″E	Upload Photo
S-GJ-81	Stone Memorial Inscription & Battlefield		Shekhpat	Jamnagar		Upload Photo
S-GJ-82	Kotho		Jodiya	Jamnagar		Upload Photo
S-GJ-83	Kalika Mata Temple		Dhrasan Vel	Devbhumi Dwarka	22°17′17″N 69°02′23″E	Kalika Mata Temple More images
S-GJ-84	Stone Memorial of Bhuchar Mori Deri & Battlefield		Dhrol	Jamnagar	22°34′58″N 70°23′52″E	Stone Memorial of Bhuchar Mori Deri & Battlefield More images
S-GJ-85	Forts Nr. Kileshwar	Rav no Nes	Ghumli	Devbhumi Dwarka	21°50′24″N 69°44′44″E	Upload Photo
S-GJ-86	Ganesh Temple		Ghumli	Devbhumi Dwarka	21°52′59″N 69°45′39″E	Upload Photo
S-GJ-87	Navlakha Temple		Ghumli	Devbhumi Dwarka	21°52′59″N 69°45′39″E	Navlakha Temple More images
S-GJ-88	Ancient Temple on the Bank of Chhelsar Talav		Ghumli	Devbhumi Dwarka	21°53′07″N 69°45′22″E	Upload Photo
S-GJ-89	Rampol Gates		Ghumli	Devbhumi Dwarka		Upload Photo
S-GJ-90	Vikiya Vav		Ghumli	Devbhumi Dwarka	21°52′59″N 69°45′39″E	Upload Photo
S-GJ-91	Son Kansari		Ghumli	Devbhumi Dwarka	21°52′47″N 69°45′05″E	Son Kansari More images
S-GJ-92	Five Temples		Pachhtar	Devbhumi Dwarka	21°52′05″N 69°40′52″E	Upload Photo
S-GJ-93	Bhimeshwar Mahadev Temples		Near Pachhtar	Devbhumi Dwarka	21°52′29″N 69°40′36″E	Upload Photo
S-GJ-94	Two Bhavaneshwar Temples		Bhavaneshwar	Devbhumi Dwarka	21°53′13″N 69°41′13″E	Upload Photo
S-GJ-95	Fort		Modpar	Devbhumi Dwarka	21°51′14″N 69°48′31″E	Fort More images
S-GJ-96	Stepwell		Modpar	Devbhumi Dwarka		Stepwell More images
S-GJ-97	Dhingeshwar Mahadev Temple & Shail Gufao	Dhingeshwar??	Modpar	Devbhumi Dwarka	21°43′09″N 69°42′24″E	Upload Photo
S-GJ-98	Panoti Temple		Hathla	Devbhumi Dwarka	21°51′13″N 69°37′20″E	Upload Photo
S-GJ-99	Shani Vav		Hathla	Devbhumi Dwarka	21°51′12″N 69°37′20″E	Upload Photo
S-GJ-100	Mound (Modpar)		Modpar (Lalpur)	Jamnagar		Upload Photo
S-GJ-101	Temple & Two Inscriptions (Ajara Parshwanath)		Ajara (Una)	Gir Somnath	20°47′28″N 71°03′52″E	Upload Photo
S-GJ-102	Seven Basins of Hot Water (Kunds)	Tulsishyam	Una-Tulsishyam Road	Gir Somnath	21°03′03″N 71°01′28″E	Upload Photo
S-GJ-103	Stone Inscriptions Near Talav		Una-Tuslishyam Road	Gir Somnath		Upload Photo
S-GJ-104	Bhimchas		Una-Tulsishyam Road	Gir Somnath	21°03′25″N 71°02′40″E	Upload Photo
S-GJ-105	Gupta Prayag (Delisted ?)		Una	Junagadh	20°47′03″N 71°01′20″E	Upload Photo
S-GJ-106	Gupta Prayag Kund (Delisted ?)		Una	Junagadh	20°45′08″N 70°59′58″E	Upload Photo
S-GJ-107	Jumma Masjid (Mosque)		Delvada	Gir Somnath		Upload Photo
S-GJ-108	Minaravali Masjid		Delvada	Gir Somnath	20°46′29″N 71°02′43″E	Upload Photo
S-GJ-109	Vejal Kotho		Delvada	Gir Somnath	20°46′25″N 71°02′43″E	Upload Photo
S-GJ-110	Shah Kotho		Delvada	Gir Somnath	20°46′32″N 71°02′59″E	Upload Photo
S-GJ-111	Sana Caves		Shana - Vankia (Una)	Gir Somnath	20°57′44″N 71°12′03″E	Upload Photo
S-GJ-112	Two Stone Inscriptions on Jumma Masjid		Kutiyana	Porbandar	21°37′17″N 69°59′00″E	Upload Photo
S-GJ-113	Two Idols of Kshetrapal At Vav (Pujari Vav)		Kutiyana	Porbandar	21°37′14″N 69°58′15″E	Upload Photo
S-GJ-114	Adi Kadi Vav	Uparkot	Junagadh	Junagadh	21°31′37″N 70°28′11″E	Adi Kadi Vav More images
S-GJ-115	Jumma Masjid & and Cannon (Neelam And Kadanal)	Uparkot	Junagadh	Junagadh	21°31′29″N 70°28′12″E	Jumma Masjid & and Cannon (Neelam And Kadanal) More images
S-GJ-116	Navghan Kuvo (Well)	Uparkot	Junagadh	Junagadh	21°31′26″N 70°28′09″E	Navghan Kuvo (Well) More images
S-GJ-117	Stone Inscription of Ra'Mandlik (Samvat 1507)	Uparkot	Junagadh	Junagadh		Upload Photo
S-GJ-118	Laskari Vav	Uparkot	Junagadh	Junagadh	21°31′21″N 70°28′09″E	Upload Photo
S-GJ-119	Replica of Ashoka Stone Inscription	On the way to Girnar Hill	Junagadh	Junagadh		Upload Photo
S-GJ-120	Damodar Kund	On the way to Girnar Hill	Junagadh	Junagadh	21°31′32″N 70°29′04″E	Damodar Kund More images
S-GJ-121	Datar no Chilo		Junagadh	Junagadh	21°29′45″N 70°30′11″E	Upload Photo
S-GJ-122	Boria Buddhistic Monument Lakhamedi & Vadi- Lakhamedi		Near Bordevi	Junagadh	21°29′40″N 70°31′51″E	Upload Photo
S-GJ-123	Dhori (Peer) Makbaro		Junagadh	Junagadh		Upload Photo
S-GJ-124	Narsinh Maheta No Choro		Junagadh	Junagadh	21°31′46″N 70°27′50″E	Upload Photo
S-GJ-125	Makbara of Babi raja Before Nawab Mahotabkhanji		Junagadh	Junagadh	21°31′22″N 70°27′38″E	Upload Photo
S-GJ-126	Makbara of Najubibi with Bara Saiyed (Najibai Maqbara)		Junagadh	Junagadh	21°31′52″N 70°28′04″E	Makbara of Najubibi with Bara Saiyed (Najibai Maqbara) More images
S-GJ-127	Pancheshwar Caves		Junagadh	Junagadh		Upload Photo
S-GJ-128	Mahabat Maqbara complex		Junagadh	Junagadh	21°31′38″N 70°27′37″E	Mahabat Maqbara complex More images
S-GJ-129	Matri Mata temple		Junagadh	Junagadh	21°31′39″N 70°28′09″E	Upload Photo
S-GJ-130	Stone Inscription with Mai Gadechi of H. S. 685		Junagadh	Junagadh	21°31′54″N 70°27′58″E	Upload Photo
S-GJ-131	Kalika Mata	On Girnar Hill	Junagadh	Junagadh	21°31′41″N 70°31′38″E	Upload Photo
S-GJ-132	Guru Datatraya	On Girnar Hill	Junagadh	Junagadh	21°31′41″N 70°32′01″E	Upload Photo
S-GJ-133	Gorakh Mountain Top (Tuk)	On Girnar Hill	Junagadh	Junagadh	21°31′39″N 70°31′52″E	Upload Photo
S-GJ-134	Gaumukhi	On Girnar Hill	Junagadh	Junagadh	21°31′39″N 70°31′30″E	Upload Photo
S-GJ-135	Bhim Kund	On Girnar Hill	Junagadh	Junagadh	21°31′40″N 70°31′24″E	Upload Photo
S-GJ-136	Bhairav Jep (Hill Outcrop)	On Girnar Hill	Junagadh	Junagadh	21°31′51″N 70°31′26″E	Upload Photo
S-GJ-137	Wooden Sandal (Paduka) Of Ramchandraji	On Girnar hill	Junagadh	Junagadh	21°32′04″N 70°31′48″E	Upload Photo
S-GJ-138	Hanumam Dhara	On Girnar Hill	Junagadh	Junagadh	21°32′07″N 70°31′46″E	Upload Photo
S-GJ-139	Hathi Pagla (Gajapad Kund)	On Girnar Hill	Junagadh	Junagadh	21°31′43″N 70°31′24″E	Upload Photo
S-GJ-140	Bhimdeval (Sun temple)		Bhimdeval (Talala)	Gir Somnath	20°57′41″N 70°36′46″E	Bhimdeval (Sun temple) More images
S-GJ-141	Buddhist Stupa - Vajir Panat No Kotho		Hadmatiya, Talala	Gir Somnath		Upload Photo
S-GJ-142	Vishnu Temple		Odadar	Porbandar	21°34′43″N 69°40′32″E	Upload Photo
S-GJ-143	Surya Mandir No.1		Odadar	Porbandar	21°34′43″N 69°40′32″E	Surya Mandir No.1 More images
S-GJ-144	Surya Mandir No.2		Odadar	Porbandar	21°34′43″N 69°40′32″E	Upload Photo
S-GJ-145	Khimeshwar Mahadev Temple		Kuchhadi	Porbandar	21°40′56″N 69°32′06″E	Khimeshwar Mahadev Temple More images
S-GJ-146	Chadeshwar Mahadev Temple		Chhaya	Porbandar	21°36′27″N 69°38′46″E	Upload Photo
S-GJ-147	Dhigeshwar Mahadev Temple		Chhaya	Porbandar	21°36′46″N 69°38′20″E	Upload Photo
S-GJ-148	House of Smt. Kasturba Gandhi		Porbandar	Porbandar	21°38′29″N 69°36′00″E	House of Smt. Kasturba Gandhi More images
S-GJ-149	Sartanji no Choro		Porbandar	Porbandar	21°38′32″N 69°36′21″E	Upload Photo
S-GJ-150	Surya Mandir and Sapta Matrika Mandir		Boricha	Porbandar	21°43′43″N 69°39′49″E	Surya Mandir and Sapta Matrika Mandir More images
S-GJ-151	Jaleshwar Mahadev temple		Fatana	Porbandar	21°53′05″N 69°33′21″E	Upload Photo
S-GJ-152	Five Temples		Balej	Porbandar	21°22′40″N 69°52′13″E	Five Temples More images
S-GJ-153	Nandeshwar Mahadev		Bokhira	Porbandar	21°41′02″N 69°36′55″E	Upload Photo
S-GJ-154	Chamunda Mata Temple		Juna Bokhira	Porbandar	21°40′09″N 69°36′27″E	Upload Photo
S-GJ-155	Seven Temples / Saat Mandiro		Bhansara	Porbandar	21°22′07″N 69°52′50″E	Seven Temples / Saat Mandiro More images
S-GJ-156	Ancient Temple (near Madhavrai temple)		Madhavpur Ghed	Porbandar	21°15′22″N 69°57′25″E	Ancient Temple (near Madhavrai temple)
S-GJ-157	Ancient Temple		Miyani	Porbandar	21°50′23″N 69°22′56″E	Upload Photo
S-GJ-158	Panchayatan Mandir		Visavada	Porbandar	21°46′27″N 69°27′11″E	Upload Photo
S-GJ-159	Vav		Visavada	Porbandar	21°46′27″N 69°27′11″E	Vav
S-GJ-160	Dhanvantari no Palio	Moti Dhaneti	Maliya Hatina	Junagadh	21°05′42″N 70°19′12″E	Upload Photo
S-GJ-161	Memorial Stone of Dah Culture		Bagasara-Ghed	Junagadh		Upload Photo
S-GJ-162	Jadeshwar Mahadev Temple		Amardad (Gadh)	Porbandar	21°41′43″N 69°43′22″E	Upload Photo
S-GJ-163	Bileshwar Mahadev Temple		Bileshawar	Porbandar	21°46′49″N 69°47′14″E	Bileshwar Mahadev Temple More images
S-GJ-164	Jambuvanti Caves		Ranavav	Porbandar	21°42′44″N 69°43′02″E	Jambuvanti Caves More images
S-GJ-165	Hani Vav-no Shilalekh		Dhandhusar	Junagadh		Upload Photo
S-GJ-166	Shamiyana and Ceiling of Jumma Masjid- S.1408		Vanthli	Junagadh	21°28′41″N 70°19′49″E	Upload Photo
S-GJ-167	Ra'Khengar Palace (now part of Girnar Jain temples)	On Girnar Hill	Junagadh	Junagadh	21°31′37″N 70°31′24″E	Upload Photo
S-GJ-168	Stone Inscription of Vijayeshwar Mahadev -1346/1408		Dhandhusar	Junagadh		Upload Photo
S-GJ-169	Surya Kund		Dhandhusar	Junagadh		Upload Photo
S-GJ-170	Ra Khengar Vav		Vanthli	Junagadh	21°29′31″N 70°23′04″E	Upload Photo
S-GJ-171	Caves of Hothal Padmani		Jetalpur	Junagadh		Upload Photo
S-GJ-172	Ancient Temples (Omnath Mahadev temple)		Umba	Gir Somnath	20°59′33″N 70°23′24″E	Upload Photo
S-GJ-173	Makbaro of Hajarat Shah & Tomb of Malik Ayaz		Una	Gir Somnath	20°49′43″N 71°02′40″E	Upload Photo
S-GJ-174	Kalikamata Temple		Navadra	Gir Somnath	20°55′48″N 70°27′32″E	Upload Photo
S-GJ-175	Bilingual Stone Inscription at Gayatri Temple		Prashnavada	Gir Somnath	20°49′15″N 70°33′19″E	Upload Photo
S-GJ-176	Prachi Kund		Una-Veraval Road	Gir Somnath	20°55′17″N 70°36′31″E	Upload Photo
S-GJ-177	Mool Prachi		Una-Veraval Road	Gir Somnath	20°55′18″N 70°36′31″E	Upload Photo
S-GJ-178	Stone Inscription at Kaji Masjid - H.S.902		Prabahs Patan	Gir Somnath	20°53′31″N 70°24′10″E	Upload Photo
S-GJ-179	Gorakhnath Mahadev	Gorakhmadhi		Gir Somnath	20°54′18″N 70°32′13″E	Upload Photo
S-GJ-180	Jain Temple		Prabhas Patan	Gir Somnath	20°53′25″N 70°24′09″E	Upload Photo
S-GJ-181	Talav		Prabahs Patan	Gir Somnath	20°54′03″N 70°23′47″E	Upload Photo
S-GJ-182	Mound of Nagara		Prabhas Patan	Gir Somnath	20°53′59″N 70°25′18″E	Upload Photo
S-GJ-183	Nek Mahommad Masjid		Prabhas Patan	Gir Somnath	20°53′33″N 70°24′04″E	Upload Photo
S-GJ-184	Buddhist Caves		Prabhas Patan	Gir Somnath	20°53′31″N 70°24′45″E	Upload Photo
S-GJ-185	Ancient Jain Temple (Museum Building)		Prabhas Patan	Gir Somnath	20°53′26″N 70°24′08″E	Upload Photo
S-GJ-186	Stone Inscription of Bhadrakali Mata		Prabhas Patan	Gir Somnath	20°53′01″N 70°24′34″E	Upload Photo
S-GJ-187	Maipuri Masjid		Prabahs Patan	Gir Somnath		Upload Photo
S-GJ-188	Mangaroli Shah Makbaro & Shah Makbaro with Stone Inscription		Prabhas Patan	Gir Somnath		Upload Photo
S-GJ-189	Stone Inscription at Mussaffar Masjid		Prabahas Patan	Gir Somnath		Upload Photo
S-GJ-190	Stone Inscription Near Mota Darwaja		Prabahs Patan	Gir Somnath		Upload Photo
S-GJ-191	Ceiling of Riyapir Masjid		Prabhas Patan	Gir Somnath		Upload Photo
S-GJ-192	Rudreshwar		Prabhas Patan	Gir Somnath	20°53′10″N 70°24′37″E	Upload Photo
S-GJ-193	Veneshwar Mahadev Temple		Prabhas Patan	Gir Somnath	20°53′24″N 70°24′27″E	Upload Photo
S-GJ-194	Veraval Gate		Prabhas Patan	Gir Somnath	20°53′38″N 70°24′07″E	Upload Photo
S-GJ-195	Stone Inscription of Sultan Ahmed (H.S. 905 - 1543)		Prabahs Patan	Gir Somnath		Upload Photo
S-GJ-196	Surya Mandir (Sun Temple)	Near Shitala Manadir, Nagar Timba	Prabhas Patan	Gir Somnath	20°53′10″N 70°24′47″E	Surya Mandir (Sun Temple) More images
S-GJ-197	Mound of Sav		Prabhas Patan	Gir Somnath		Upload Photo
S-GJ-198	Stone Inscription at Jumma Masjid (H.S.732) (AD 1331-32)		Veraval	Gir Somnath		Upload Photo
S-GJ-199	Stone Inscription at Harshadmata Temple		Veraval	Gir Somnath		Upload Photo
S-GJ-200	Bauddha Guffa (Caves) of Mandore (Mandovar)		Savani-Geer	Gir Somnath	20°58′36″N 70°28′19″E	Upload Photo
S-GJ-201	Chyavan Kund		Sutrapada	Gir Somnath	20°50′21″N 70°29′05″E	Upload Photo
S-GJ-202	Navdurga Temple		Sutrapada	Gir Somnath	20°50′18″N 70°29′01″E	Upload Photo
S-GJ-203	Chaumukhi Vav		Chobari	Surendranagar	22°15′31″N 71°12′23″E	Upload Photo
S-GJ-204	Temple Near Talav		Chobari	Surendranagar	22°15′33″N 71°12′19″E	Upload Photo
S-GJ-205	Tarnetar Temple		Thangadh	Surendranagar	22°38′43″N 71°12′40″E	Upload Photo
S-GJ-206	Munibaba Temple (Munim deval)		Thangadh	Surendranagar	22°31′55″N 71°12′20″E	Upload Photo
S-GJ-207	Panchayatan Temple		Parabadi	Surendranagar	22°14′33″N 71°11′29″E	Upload Photo
S-GJ-208	Caves		Bhimora	Surendranagar	22°20′10″N 71°14′25″E	Upload Photo
S-GJ-209	Jeen Darwajo		Zinzuwada	Surendranagar	23°21′02″N 71°39′41″E	Upload Photo
S-GJ-210	Dink Darwajo		Zinzuwada	Surendranagar	23°21′18″N 71°39′22″E	Upload Photo
S-GJ-211	South Gates (Dakhkhani Darwaja)		Zinzuwada	Surendranagar	23°20′51″N 71°39′24″E	Upload Photo
S-GJ-212	West Gates		Zinzuwada	Surendranagar	23°20′59″N 71°39′16″E	Upload Photo
S-GJ-213	Madapol Gates		Zinzuwada	Surendranagar	23°21′02″N 71°39′11″E	Upload Photo
S-GJ-214	Rajeshwari Gates		Zinzuwada	Surendranagar	23°20′52″N 71°39′12″E	Upload Photo
S-GJ-215	Sarovar		Zinzuwada	Surendranagar	23°21′02″N 71°39′26″E	Upload Photo
S-GJ-216	Jeenand Kund (Two)		Zinzuwada	Surendranagar	23°21′03″N 71°39′25″E	Upload Photo
S-GJ-217	Remains of Ancient Gates		Kankavati	Surendranagar	23°04′08″N 71°21′26″E	Upload Photo
S-GJ-218	Matri Vav		Kankavati	Surendranagar	23°04′20″N 71°21′15″E	Upload Photo
S-GJ-219	Chandrisar Talav		Pratappur	Surendranagar	22°51′33″N 71°36′40″E	Upload Photo
S-GJ-220	Ancient Vav		Hampur	Surendranagar	22°54′26″N 71°34′12″E	Upload Photo
S-GJ-221	Gramdevi Temple		Kalmad	Surendranagar		Upload Photo
S-GJ-222	Gangavo Kund and Four Temples on it		Dedadara	Surendranagar	22°46′03″N 71°45′50″E	Upload Photo
S-GJ-223	Manava Mama temple		Dedadara	Surendranagar		Upload Photo
S-GJ-224	Rataba alias Rajbai Vav		Rampura	Surendranagar	22°35′51″N 71°32′35″E	Upload Photo
S-GJ-225	Ganga Vav		Wadhwan	Surendranagar	22°42′30″N 71°40′53″E	Upload Photo
S-GJ-226	Madhavav		Wadhwan	Surendranagar	22°42′34″N 71°40′28″E	Madhavav More images
S-GJ-227	Vav		Dhandhalpur	Surendranagar	22°23′29″N 71°21′38″E	Upload Photo
S-GJ-228	Sundari Bhavani Temple		Halvad	Morbi	22°50′28″N 71°07′42″E	Upload Photo
S-GJ-229	Memorial Stone near Cemetery		Halvad	Morbi	23°01′06″N 71°11′28″E	Upload Photo
S-GJ-230	Ancient Vav at Sharneshwar Temple		Halvad	Morbi	23°00′26″N 71°10′56″E	Upload Photo
S-GJ-231	Tom Coryat Makbaro (Thomas Coryat's Tomb)		Rajgari Near Suvali	Surat	21°11′03″N 72°38′16″E	Tom Coryat Makbaro (Thomas Coryat's Tomb) More images
S-GJ-232	Radhakrishna Temple		Dharampur	Valsad	20°32′07″N 73°10′22″E	Upload Photo
S-GJ-233	Ancient Vav/Stepwell		Ambapur	Gandhinagar	23°09′07″N 72°36′40″E	Ancient Vav/Stepwell More images
S-GJ-234	Arjun Chori (Shiva Temple)	Kaleshwari	Lavana	Mahisagar	23°19′20″N 73°35′07″E	Upload Photo
S-GJ-235	Kund (Hidimba Kund)	Kaleshwari	Lavana	Mahisagar	23°19′16″N 73°34′57″E	Upload Photo
S-GJ-236	Temple with Three Entrances (Hidimba Temple)	Kaleshwari	Lavana	Mahisagar	23°19′20″N 73°35′08″E	Upload Photo
S-GJ-237	Ancient Temple (Ghummatvalu Mandir)	Kaleshwari	Lavana	Mahisagar	23°19′17″N 73°34′57″E	Ancient Temple (Ghummatvalu Mandir) More images
S-GJ-238	Bhim Chori (Shiva Temple)	Kaleshwari	Lavana	Mahisagar	23°19′18″N 73°35′06″E	Upload Photo
S-GJ-239	Vahu Ni Vav	Kaleshwari	Lavana	Mahisagar	23°19′18″N 73°34′55″E	Vahu Ni Vav More images
S-GJ-240	Shikar Madhi	Kaleshwari	Lavana	Mahisagar	23°19′17″N 73°34′59″E	Shikar Madhi More images
S-GJ-241	Temple with stone Inscription (Kaleshwari Mata Temple)	Kaleshwari	Lavana	Mahisagar	23°19′17″N 73°34′57″E	Temple with stone Inscription (Kaleshwari Mata Temple) More images
S-GJ-242	Sasu Ni Vav	Kaleshwari	Lavana	Mahisagar	23°19′16″N 73°34′55″E	Sasu Ni Vav More images
S-GJ-243	Ancient temple no.1		Santrampur	Mahisagar	23°11′50″N 73°52′53″E	Upload Photo
S-GJ-244	Ancient temple no.2		Santarampur	Mahisagar	23°11′50″N 73°52′53″E	Upload Photo
S-GJ-245	Ancient temple no.3		Santarampur	Mahisagar	23°11′50″N 73°52′53″E	Upload Photo
S-GJ-246	Gebanshah Vav with Steps		Champaner	Panchmahals	22°28′50″N 73°31′52″E	Upload Photo
S-GJ-247	Vanzari Vav		Kankanpur	Panchmahals	22°49′54″N 73°29′15″E	Upload Photo
S-GJ-248	Group of temples	Tuwa	Kankanpur	Panchmahals	22°47′57″N 73°27′37″E	Upload Photo
S-GJ-249	Pavagadh Killa		Pavagadh/Chmpaner	Panchmahals	22°28′34″N 73°31′57″E	Upload Photo
S-GJ-250	Machi Killa		Pavagadh/Chmpaner	Panchmahals	22°28′06″N 73°31′26″E	Upload Photo
S-GJ-251	Bavaman Killa		Pavagadh/Chmpaner	Panchmahals		Upload Photo
S-GJ-252	Khuneshwar Killa		Pavagadh/Chmpaner	Panchmahals		Upload Photo
S-GJ-253	Killa at Shikar bari and Ulan Julan ki Chowki		Pavagadh/Chmpaner	Panchmahals		Upload Photo
S-GJ-254	Malik Nagar ni Haveli		Pavagadh/Chmpaner	Panchmahals		Upload Photo
S-GJ-255	Gadi Kundal Darwaza		Pavagadh/Chmpaner	Panchmahals		Upload Photo
S-GJ-256	Jai Singh no Mahal		Pavagadh/Chmpaner	Panchmahals		Upload Photo
S-GJ-257	Senapati Ni Kothi		Pavagadh/Chmpaner	Panchmahals		Upload Photo
S-GJ-258	Pavilion on medhi Talav		Pavagadh/Chmpaner	Panchmahals		Upload Photo
S-GJ-259	Masjid in Front of Machi Haveli		Pavagadh/Chmpaner	Panchmahals		Upload Photo
S-GJ-260	Maratha no Mahal		Pavagadh/Chmpaner	Panchmahals		Upload Photo
S-GJ-261	Rani no Mahal		Pavagadh/Chmpaner	Panchmahals		Upload Photo
S-GJ-262	Bandh		Pavagadh/Chmpaner	Panchmahals		Upload Photo
S-GJ-263	Lila Gumbaj Pase ni Kothi		Pavagadh/Chmpaner	Panchmahals		Upload Photo
S-GJ-264	Bhangelu Deru		Pavagadh/Chmpaner	Panchmahals		Upload Photo
S-GJ-265	Chhatris Thambla Nu Bhoyeru		Pavagadh/Chmpaner	Panchmahals		Upload Photo
S-GJ-266	Zare-e-Zamin		Pavagadh/Chmpaner	Panchmahals		Upload Photo
S-GJ-267	Pavilion South of Jami Masjid		Pavagadh/Chmpaner	Panchmahals		Upload Photo
S-GJ-268	Iteri Masjid and Building near to it		Pavagadh/Chmpaner	Panchmahals	22°29′18″N 73°31′42″E	Iteri Masjid and Building near to it More images
S-GJ-269	Sainiki Masjid		Pavagadh/Chmpaner	Panchmahals		Upload Photo
S-GJ-270	Vandra Masjid		Pavagadh/Chmpaner	Panchmahals		Upload Photo
S-GJ-271	Maqbara Mandvi		Pavagadh/Chmpaner	Panchmahals	22°29′44″N 73°30′43″E	Upload Photo
S-GJ-272	Maqbara Near Kamani Masjid		Pavagadh/Chmpaner	Panchmahals		Upload Photo
S-GJ-273	Underground Water Channel From Bandh to Kasbin Talao		Pavagadh/Chmpaner	Panchmahals		Upload Photo
S-GJ-274	Underground Water Channel from Navlakhi Talav to Jamuna Kund		Pavagadh/Chmpaner	Panchmahals		Upload Photo
S-GJ-275	Stone Bridge		Pavagadh/Chmpaner	Panchmahals		Upload Photo
S-GJ-276	Barrack on Sarriya Vakhariya		Pavagadh/Chmpaner	Panchmahals		Upload Photo
S-GJ-277	Malik Sandal Ni Vav		Mandvi village (Halol)	Panchmahals	22°29′38″N 73°30′53″E	Upload Photo
S-GJ-278	Sindh Mata Ni Vav		Halol Nagar	Panchmahals	22°29′50″N 73°29′35″E	Upload Photo
S-GJ-279	Chandralekha (Surajkala) Vav		Halol Nagar	Panchmahals	22°29′51″N 73°28′42″E	Upload Photo
S-GJ-280	Amther Mata Temple& Small Temples		Vadnagar	Mehsana	23°47′05″N 72°38′43″E	Upload Photo
S-GJ-281	Vav		Modhera	Mehsana	23°34′58″N 72°08′13″E	Vav More images
S-GJ-282	Hawa Mahal		Modhera	Mehsana	23°35′01″N 72°08′13″E	Hawa Mahal More images
S-GJ-283	Khan Sarovar (Delisted ?)		Patan	Patan	23°50′07″N 72°06′48″E	Upload Photo
S-GJ-284	Shakti Kund		Akhaj	Mehsana	23°29′00″N 72°27′35″E	Shakti Kund More images
S-GJ-285	Amba Mata Temple		Kherva	Mehsana	23°32′49″N 72°26′36″E	Upload Photo
S-GJ-286	Shitala Mata Temple		Butapaldi	Mehsana	23°40′10″N 72°21′24″E	Shitala Mata Temple More images
S-GJ-287	Nagfani Mata Mandir (with idol)		Meu	Mehsana	23°29′48″N 72°30′53″E	Upload Photo
S-GJ-288	Shitala Mata Temple		Linch	Mehsana	23°29′42″N 72°22′28″E	Upload Photo
S-GJ-289	Vav		Mansa	Gandhinagar	23°25′24″N 72°39′30″E	Upload Photo
S-GJ-290	Fatipal Gates		Patan	Patan	23°51′18″N 72°06′42″E	Upload Photo
S-GJ-291	Chhindia Gates		Patan	Patan	23°51′21″N 72°07′14″E	Upload Photo
S-GJ-292	Bagwada Gates		Patan	Patan	23°51′07″N 72°07′27″E	Upload Photo
S-GJ-293	Agara Gates		Patan	Patan	23°51′24″N 72°06′57″E	Upload Photo
S-GJ-294	Tripalia Gate (Tran Darwaja)		Patan	Patan	23°51′02″N 72°06′52″E	Upload Photo
S-GJ-295	Rajgadhi Timbo		Umta	Mehsana	23°46′52″N 72°33′18″E	Upload Photo
S-GJ-296	Shail Gufao (Khambhalida Caves)		Khambhalida	Rajkot	21°46′31″N 70°42′29″E	Shail Gufao (Khambhalida Caves) More images
S-GJ-297	Minaldevi Vav		Virpur	Rajkot	21°50′53″N 70°41′47″E	Upload Photo
S-GJ-298	Memorial Stone of Lakha Fulani		Atkot	Rajkot	22°00′22″N 71°08′35″E	Upload Photo
S-GJ-299	Stone Inscription	In Darbargadh	Jasdan	Rajkot	22°02′17″N 71°12′30″E	Upload Photo
S-GJ-300	Caves		Dingthalo Dungar (Jasdan)	Rajkot		Upload Photo
S-GJ-301	Vav (Gelmata Vav)		Bhadla	Rajkot	22°11′10″N 71°06′07″E	Upload Photo
S-GJ-302	Sankleshwar Mahadev		Juni Sankali	Rajkot	21°41′39″N 70°33′05″E	Upload Photo
S-GJ-303	Old Darbargadh		Dhoraji	Rajkot	21°44′21″N 70°26′58″E	Upload Photo
S-GJ-304	Temples		Supedi	Rajkot	21°45′55″N 70°22′28″E	Temples More images
S-GJ-305	Kuber Vav		Morbi	Morbi	22°49′05″N 70°50′09″E	Upload Photo
S-GJ-306	Darbargadh No Tamrapatro		Morbi	Morbi	22°49′04″N 70°50′25″E	Upload Photo
S-GJ-307	Mound Dolidhar		Khorana	Rajkot	22°25′39″N 70°50′57″E	Upload Photo
S-GJ-308	Stone Inscription at Jadeshwar Mahadev		Wankaner	Morbi	22°38′44″N 70°51′16″E	Upload Photo
S-GJ-309	Ancient Vav		Sarvad	Morbi	22°58′52″N 70°42′01″E	Upload Photo
S-GJ-310	Jam Tower		Rajkot	Rajkot	22°18′23″N 70°47′50″E	Jam Tower More images
S-GJ-311	Ancient Talav		Tentalav	Vadodara	22°02′46″N 73°25′26″E	Upload Photo
S-GJ-312	Vidyadhar Vav		Sevasi	Vadodara	22°19′06″N 73°07′08″E	Vidyadhar Vav More images
S-GJ-313	Surya Narayan Temple		Vadodara	Vadodara	22°18′12″N 73°11′49″E	Surya Narayan Temple More images
S-GJ-314	Ranmukteshwar Temple		Mankani (Sankheda)	Chhota Udaipur district	22°13′31″N 73°40′18″E	Upload Photo
S-GJ-315	Kund	Gambhirpura	Idar	Sabarkantha	23°51′00″N 73°00′53″E	Upload Photo
S-GJ-316	Vav	Gambhirpura	Idar	Sabarkantha	23°50′57″N 73°00′47″E	Upload Photo
S-GJ-317	Ranmalchoki	Idariyogadh	Idar	Sabarkantha	23°51′09″N 73°00′02″E	Ranmalchoki More images
S-GJ-318	Vav		Chorivad	Sabarkantha	23°54′00″N 73°07′33″E	Upload Photo
S-GJ-319	Shiva Temple	Dantral	Detran	Sabarkantha	24°19′05″N 73°01′25″E	Upload Photo
S-GJ-320	Ancient Vav		Davad	Sabarkantha	23°43′41″N 72°51′02″E	Upload Photo
S-GJ-321	Ancient stepwell (vav)		Limbhoi	Sabarkantha	23°51′57″N 72°59′11″E	Upload Photo
S-GJ-322	Kund		Sabli	Sabarkantha	23°43′56″N 73°03′28″E	Upload Photo
S-GJ-323	Nilkanth Mahadev Temple		Poshina	Sabarkantha	24°22′29″N 73°02′01″E	Upload Photo
S-GJ-324	Mahadev Temple		Agiya	Sabarkantha	24°06′17″N 73°00′27″E	Upload Photo
S-GJ-325	Shiva Temple	Near Ganchhali	Kajavas	Sabarkantha	24°20′46″N 73°01′42″E	Upload Photo
S-GJ-326	Brahma Vav		Khedbrahma	Sabarkantha	24°02′18″N 73°02′54″E	Brahma Vav More images
S-GJ-327	Shiva Temple (No. 1)		Ganchhali	Sabarkantha	24°20′31″N 73°02′05″E	Upload Photo
S-GJ-328	Vishnu Temple (No. 2)		Ganchhali	Sabarkantha	24°20′31″N 73°02′05″E	Upload Photo
S-GJ-329	Ganesh Temple (No. 3)		Ganchhali	Sabarkantha	24°20′31″N 73°02′05″E	Upload Photo
S-GJ-330	Temple No. 4		Ganchhali	Sabarkantha	24°20′31″N 73°02′05″E	Upload Photo
S-GJ-331	Temple No. 5		Ganchhali	Sabarkantha	24°20′31″N 73°02′05″E	Upload Photo
S-GJ-332	Gopnath Mahadev Shiv Panchayatan Temple		Gota (Khedbrahma)	Sabarkantha	23°59′40″N 73°03′52″E	Upload Photo
S-GJ-333	Inscription dated AD 1408 in Jumma Masjid	Vanthali	Vanthali	Junagadh	21°28′41″N 70°19′49″E	Upload Photo
S-GJ-334	Virji Vora ni Vav		Halvad	Morbi	23°00′48″N 71°10′58″E	Upload Photo
S-GJ-335	Ruins		Nandej	Aravalli	23°42′06″N 73°15′40″E	Upload Photo
S-GJ-336	Mahakali Temple		Nandej	Aravalli	23°42′06″N 73°15′40″E	Upload Photo
S-GJ-337	Mahadev Temple		Nandej	Aravalli	23°42′06″N 73°15′40″E	Upload Photo
S-GJ-338	Hanumanji Temple		Nandej	Aravalli	23°42′06″N 73°15′40″E	Upload Photo
S-GJ-339	Shiva Panchayatan Temple		Bhetali	Aravalli	23°43′41″N 73°17′39″E	Upload Photo
S-GJ-340	Shobhayada Shiva Temple		Moti Bebar	Aravalli	23°39′05″N 73°15′36″E	Upload Photo
S-GJ-341	Shamlaji Temple		Shamlaji	Aravalli	23°41′14″N 73°23′16″E	Shamlaji Temple More images
S-GJ-342	Vav		Shamlaji	Aravalli	23°41′16″N 73°23′15″E	Upload Photo
S-GJ-343	Harishchandra ni Chori		Shamlaji	Aravalli	23°41′10″N 73°23′03″E	Upload Photo
S-GJ-344	Pagathiyavali Vav (Stepwell)		Tintoi	Aravalli	23°36′46″N 73°20′07″E	Upload Photo
S-GJ-345	Vanzari Vav		Modasa	Aravalli	23°27′53″N 73°17′53″E	Upload Photo
S-GJ-346	Shiva Temple with Kund		Abhapur	Sabarkantha	24°00′02″N 73°16′53″E	Shiva Temple with Kund More images
S-GJ-347	Jain Temple No. 1		Abhapur	Sabarkantha	24°00′06″N 73°16′55″E	Jain Temple No. 1 More images
S-GJ-348	Jain Temple No. 2		Abhapur	Sabarkantha	24°00′07″N 73°16′56″E	Jain Temple No. 2 More images
S-GJ-349	Jain Temple No. 3		Abhapur	Sabarkantha	24°00′07″N 73°16′56″E	Jain Temple No. 3 More images
S-GJ-350	Sharaneshwar Temple		Abhapur	Sabarkantha	24°00′05″N 73°16′08″E	Sharaneshwar Temple More images
S-GJ-351	Shivashakti Temple		Abhapur	Sabarkantha	23°59′58″N 73°16′29″E	Shivashakti Temple More images
S-GJ-352	Jain Temple No. 1		Antarsumba	Sabarkantha	23°59′18″N 73°13′08″E	Upload Photo
S-GJ-353	Jain Temple No. 2		Antarsumba	Sabarkantha	23°59′18″N 73°13′10″E	Upload Photo
S-GJ-354	Jain Temple No. 3		Antarsumba	Sabarkantha	23°59′18″N 73°13′09″E	Upload Photo
S-GJ-355	Jain Temple No. 4		Antarsumba	Sabarkantha	23°59′17″N 73°13′08″E	Jain Temple No. 4
S-GJ-356	Shakti Temple		Antarsumba	Sabarkantha	23°59′05″N 73°12′47″E	Shakti Temple More images
S-GJ-357	Shiva Temple		Antarsumba	Sabarkantha	23°59′05″N 73°12′36″E	Shiva Temple More images
S-GJ-358	Shiva Panchayatan Temple No. 1		Antarsumba	Sabarkantha	23°59′07″N 73°12′42″E	Shiva Panchayatan Temple No. 1 More images
S-GJ-359	Shiva Panchayatan Temple No. 2		Antarsumba	Sabarkantha	23°59′18″N 73°13′11″E	Shiva Panchayatan Temple No. 2 More images
S-GJ-360	Vav (Stepwell)		Dholi Vav (Vijaynagar)	Sabarkantha	23°59′32″N 73°14′35″E	Upload Photo
S-GJ-361	Nagrani Vav (Stepwell) (Roda Group of Temples)		Khed-Chandarani	Sabarkantha	23°39′51″N 73°05′47″E	Upload Photo
S-GJ-362	Santhaleshwar Mahadev Temple		Mathasuliya	Sabarkantha	23°35′55″N 73°08′20″E	Upload Photo
S-GJ-363	Chaumukh Mahadev Temple		Hathrol	Sabarkantha	23°30′46″N 73°07′31″E	Upload Photo
S-GJ-364	Neminath Jain Temple with three inscriptions dated Samvat 1333, 35, 39 on pillar (Girnar Jain temples)	On Girnar Hill	Junagadh	Junagadh	21°31′38″N 70°31′23″E	Neminath Jain Temple with three inscriptions dated Samvat 1333, 35, 39 on pillar (Girnar Jain temples) More images
S-GJ-365	Vastupal Jain Temple with six inscriptions dated Samvat 1288 on pillar (Girnar Jain temples)	On Girnar Hill	Junagadh	Junagadh	21°31′36″N 70°31′24″E	Vastupal Jain Temple with six inscriptions dated Samvat 1288 on pillar (Girnar Jain temples) More images
S-GJ-366	Uparkot Fort Walls and Gates	On Girnar Hill	Junagadh	Junagadh	21°31′33″N 70°28′06″E	Uparkot Fort Walls and Gates More images

== See also ==
- List of State Protected Monuments in India for other State Protected Monuments in India
- List of Monuments of National Importance in Gujarat
