= Bhuvad =

Village in Gujarat, India

Coordinates: 23.019°N 69.902°E

Bhuvad is a village in Anjar Taluka of Kutch district of Gujarat, India.

== History ==
Bhuvad got its name from a Chawda chief named Bhuvad, who ruled from this village. He was killed in a war either by Kathis or Jadeja Lakha Phulani in around 1320 A.D. It is said that his headless body is said to have fought back to Bhuvad and finally fell at a place, where, even today, a shrine with a carving of a head-less statue still stands, smeared in red color, which is dedicated to him. Near his shrine are tall tomb stones which mark the spots where warriors who died in the battle with Bhuvad Chavda were laid to rest. The scene of the fight is marked by the tombstones of fifty-six Rajputs

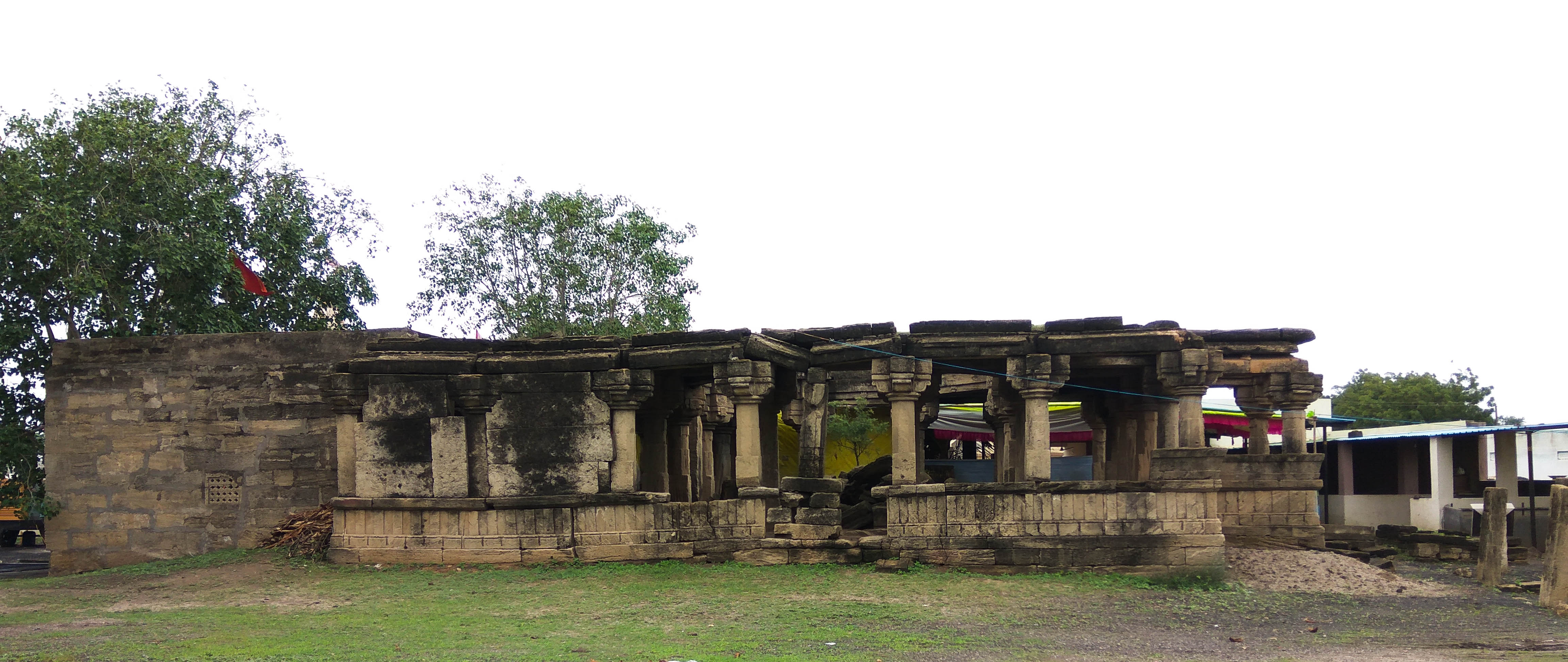
Bhuvadeshvar Mahadev Temple, Side view

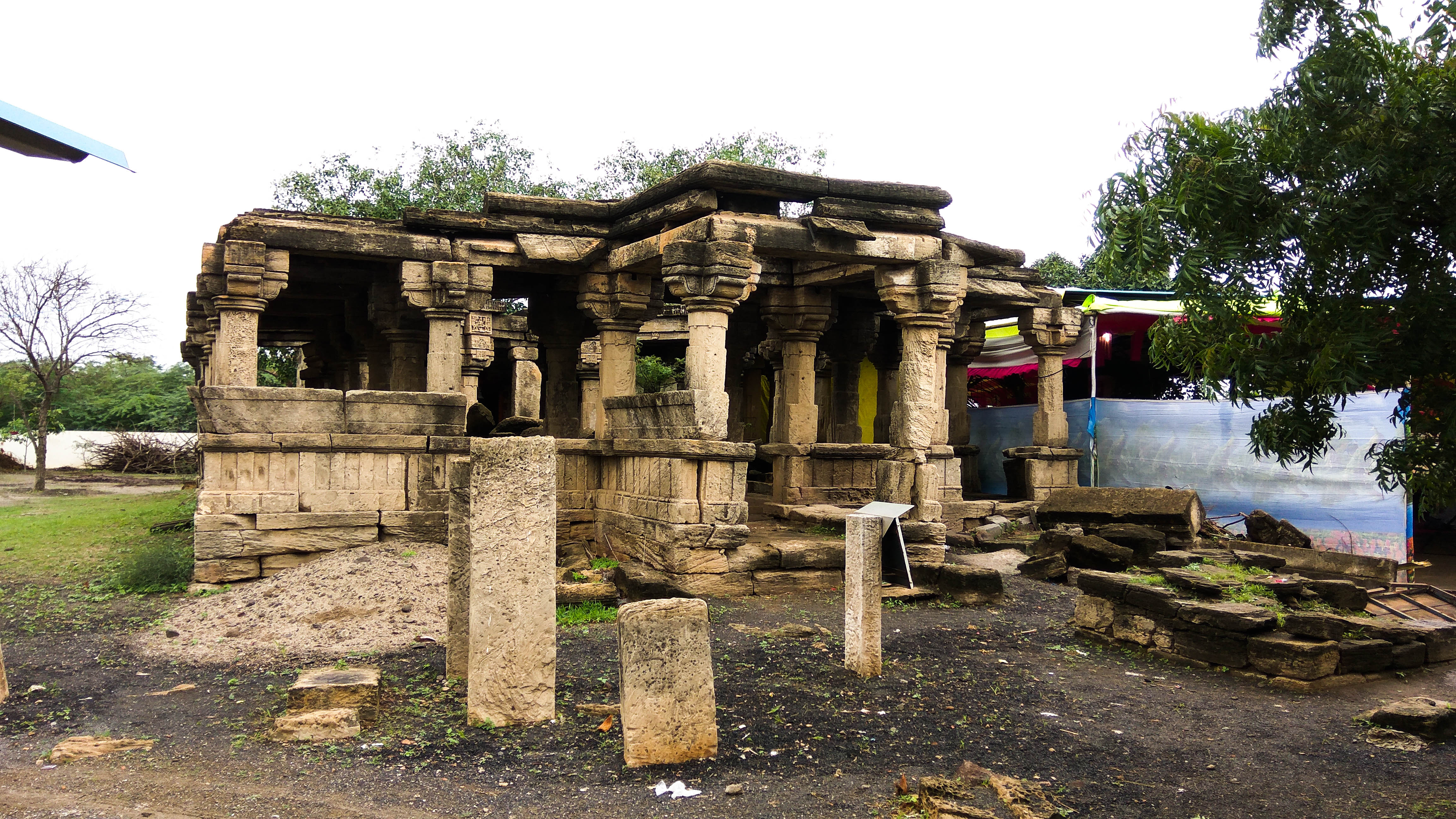
Bhuvadeshvar Mahadev Temple, Front view

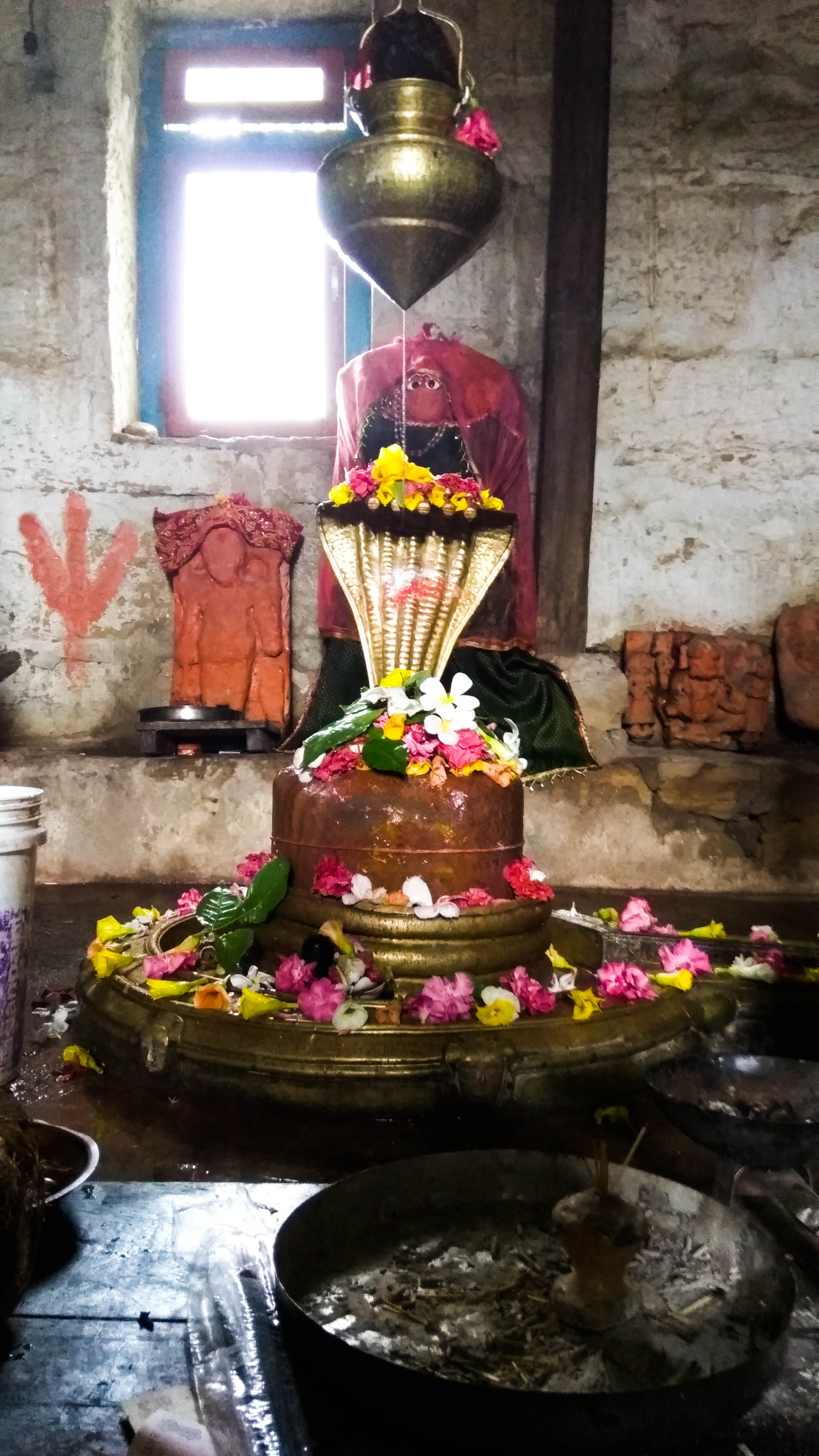
Bhuvadeshvar Mahadev

Bhuvad has a much ruined temple of Bhuvadeshvar Mahadev, which is said to have been built by Bhuvad Chavda, whose hall, mandap, measuring 31 3/4 feet by 39 1/4 inside, is supported by 64 pillars and 4 pilasters, 18 on the screen wall and 12 round the dome. The pillars are square to about one-third their height, then octagonal, and lastly round. The shrine has been large, fully 23 feet square, domed on 12 pilasters, 18 inches by 12, with four-armed figures on the brackets. The brackets of the hall columns are plain, but above the bracket a plinth, nine or ten inches deep, is carved with a raised geometrical pattern, The fronts of the brackets are carved. The walls of the temple are of stone throughout. Over the shrine door is a Devi, probably Bhavani. On the pilasters to the right of the shrine is an inscription dated 1289-90 (Samvat 1346); of which all that is now legible are the names of Vanaram and a few other Thakors, probably his ancestors.

== Demographics ==
The village majorly has Rathore population along with families of Zaru and also has a significant proportion of the population belonging to the Ahirs, Rabari and Patidar communities. The Leva Patidar of village Bhuvad have adopted the Bhudia / Bhudya surname after their ancestral village Bhuvad. The Padharia community of Kutch also have a Kuldevi temple at the village.
