= Mithi Vav =

- Interactive map of the Mithi Vav area

General information
- Architectural style: Indian architecture
- Location: Palanpur, India
- Coordinates: 24.174051°N 72.433099°E
- Completed: 8th century

Technical details
- Floor count: Five storied stepwell

Design and construction
- Architect: Local
- Designations: ASI State Protected Monument No. S-GJ-26

Mithi Vav is a stepwell located in Palanpur town of Banaskantha district, Gujarat, India. It is considered the only surviving monument of Parmara rule in the town. It was built around the 8th century. It is situated in the eastern part of the town. The five storey stepwell can be entered from the west. Based on its architectural style, it is believed that it is constructed in late medieval period but the sculptures embedded in the walls may belong to earlier period. The sculptures include that of Ganesha, Shiva, Apsaras, dancing figures, worshiping couples and floral or geometrical patterns. A worn out inscription found on one sculpture embedded in left wall cannot be read clearly, but the year Samvat 1320 (1263 AD) can made out.

== Gallery ==
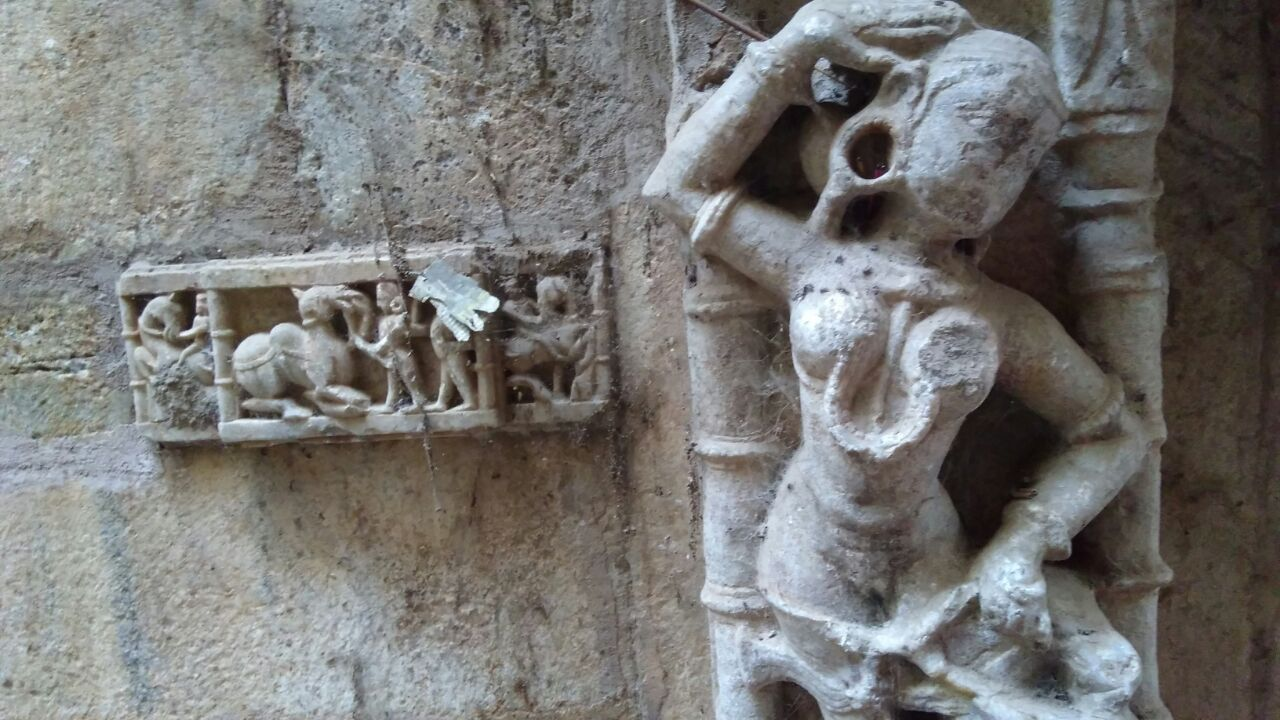
Idols embedded in walls

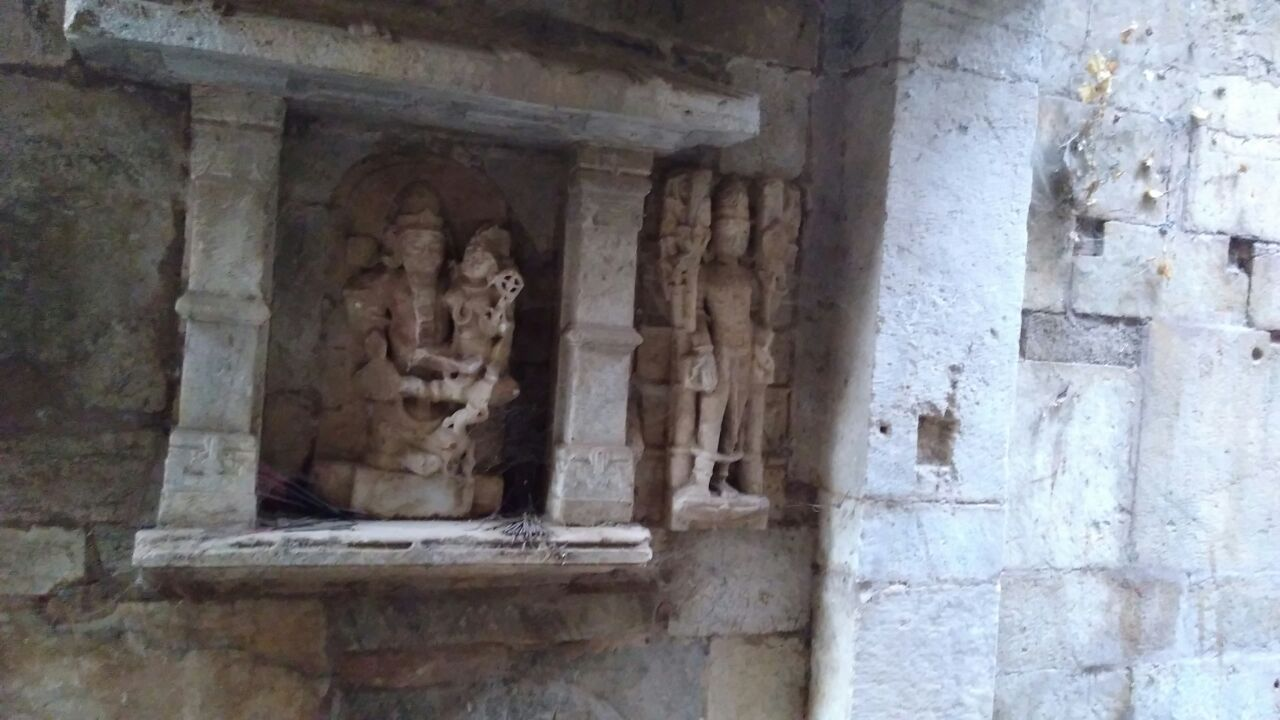
View

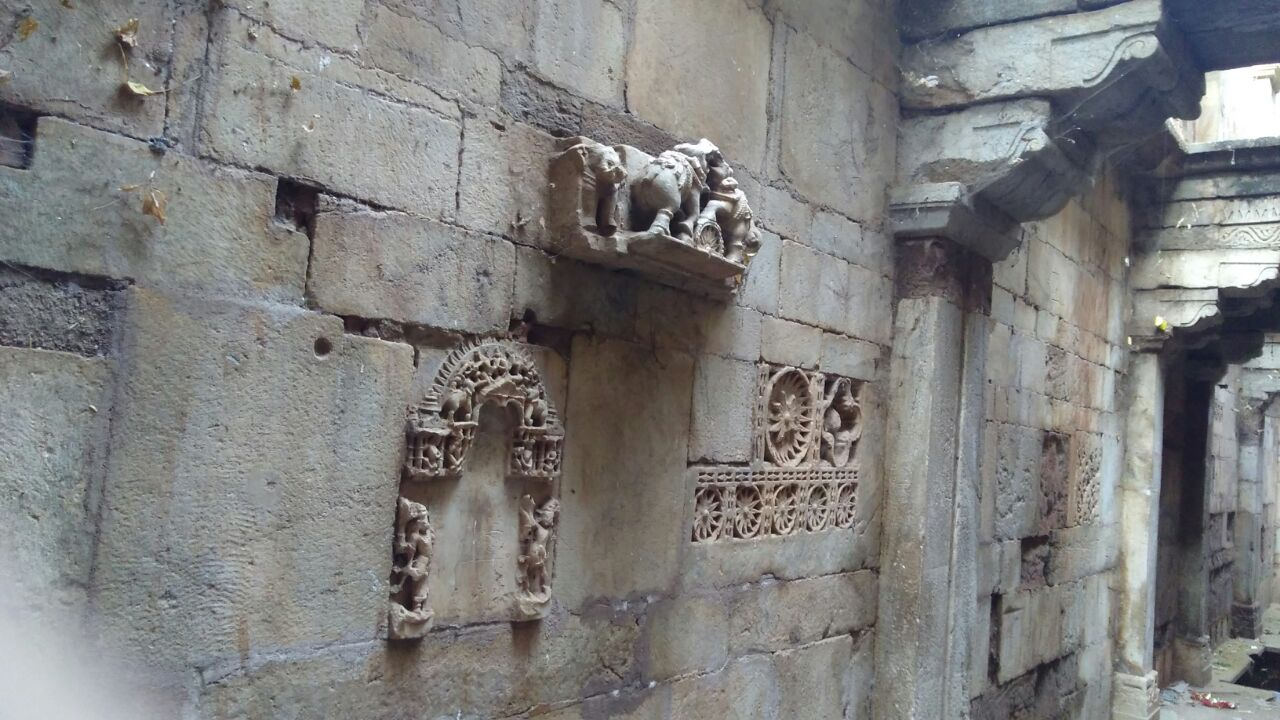
View

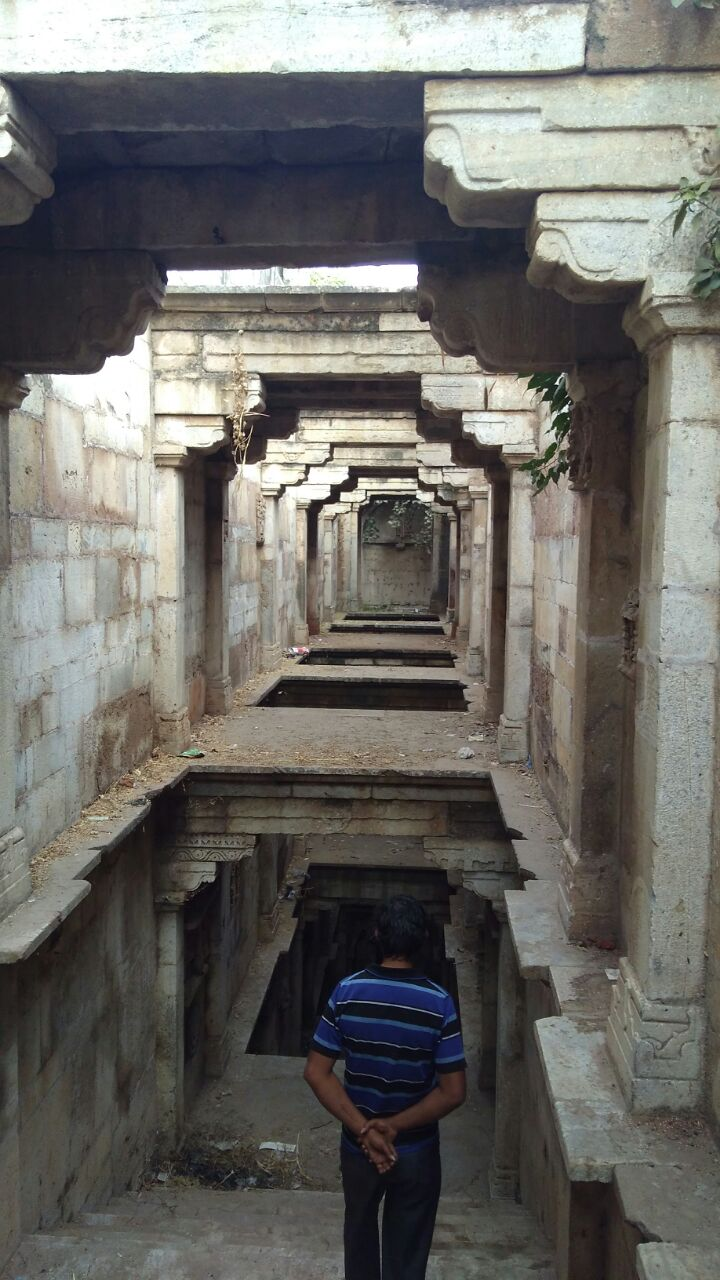
Storeys viewed from above
