= Bhadla =

Bhadla is a village in Jasdan Taluka of Rajkot district, Gujarat, India. It is about eighteen miles south-east of Rajkot.

== History ==
During the British Raj, Bhadla was the chief town of the small mahal of the same name, and, like Atkot, was originally a Kathi holding, but was acquired by Nawanagar State during the time of Meraman Khavas.

The Bhadla (vid) grassland is very large. It yields about 10,000,000 pulies or bundles of grass in a good year.
