= Shitala Mata Temple, Butapaldi =

Hindu temple dedicated to Shitala in Gujarat, India

Shitala Mata Temple
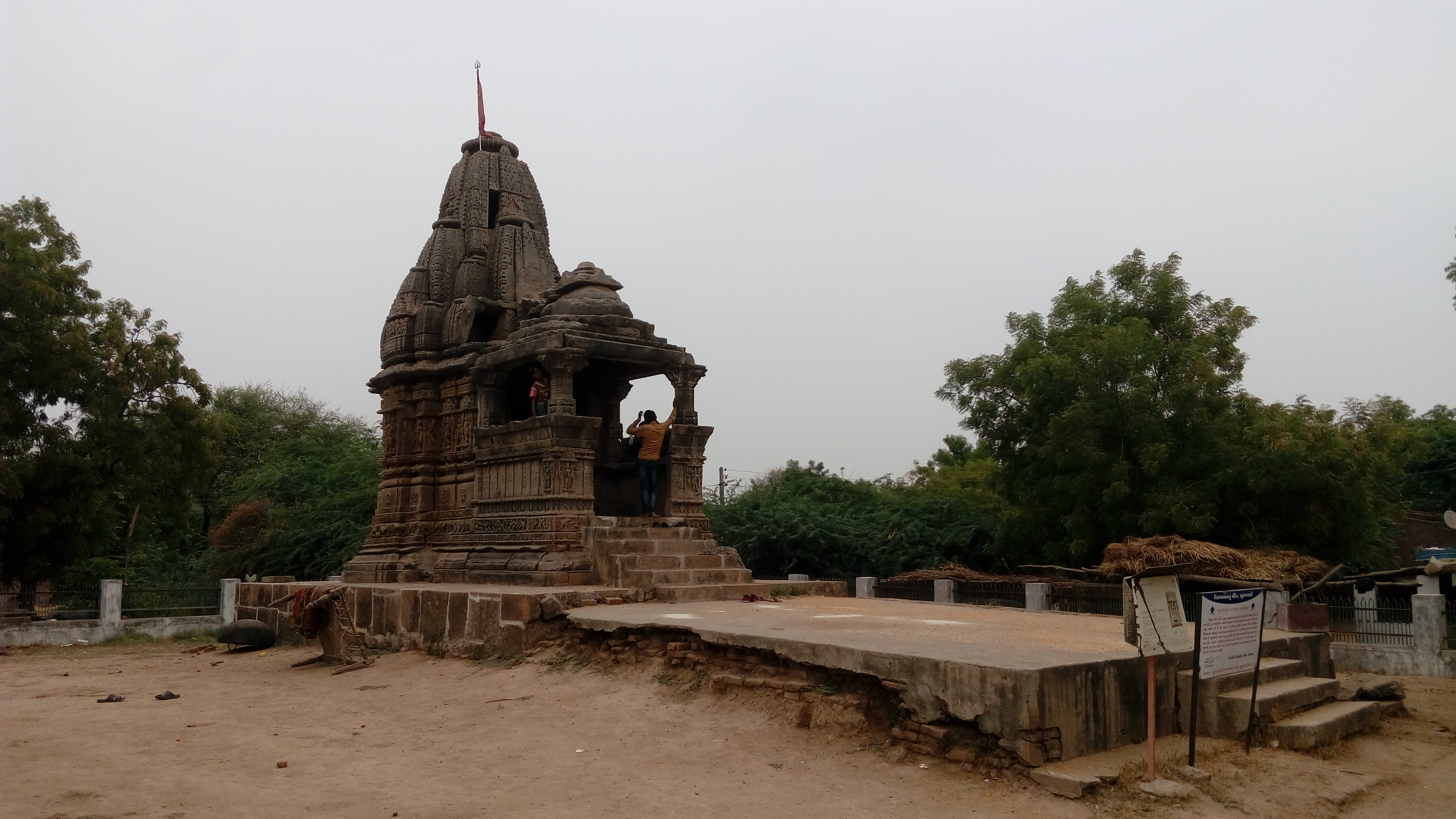
- Temple Complex from southeast

- Location in Gujarat

Religion
- Affiliation: Hinduism
- Deity: Shitala or Brahmani

Location
- Location: Butapaldi, Mehsana district
- State: Gujarat
- Country: India
- Interactive map of Shitala Mata Temple
- Coordinates: 23.6694°N 72.3567°E

Architecture
- Type: Maru-Gurjara architecture
- Completed: c. 12th century
- Temple: 1

Shitala Mata Temple is a c. 12th century Hindu temple dedicated to goddess Shitala located in Butapaldi village of Mehsana district, Gujarat, India.

== Architecture ==
The east-facing Shitala Mata temple was built in about 12th century. It has three parts: mandapa, antarala and garbhagriha (sanctum). The platform has friezes of kirtimukha, elephants, humans and deities. The doorframe of the sanctum has images of Vishnu in five niches in top section and while images of Laxmi in niches in the side sections. On the exterior walls of the sanctum, there is an image of Parvati in south niche and the images of Mahishasurmandini (Chamunda) in north and west niches. The vedika (altar), kakshasana (seatings), small pillars and the ceiling of the mandapa are decorated with fine carvings. A bust of an image is enshrined in place of the original image in the sanctum which is worshiped locally as Brahmani or Shitala Mata.

It is a state protected monument (S-GJ-286).

== Gallery ==
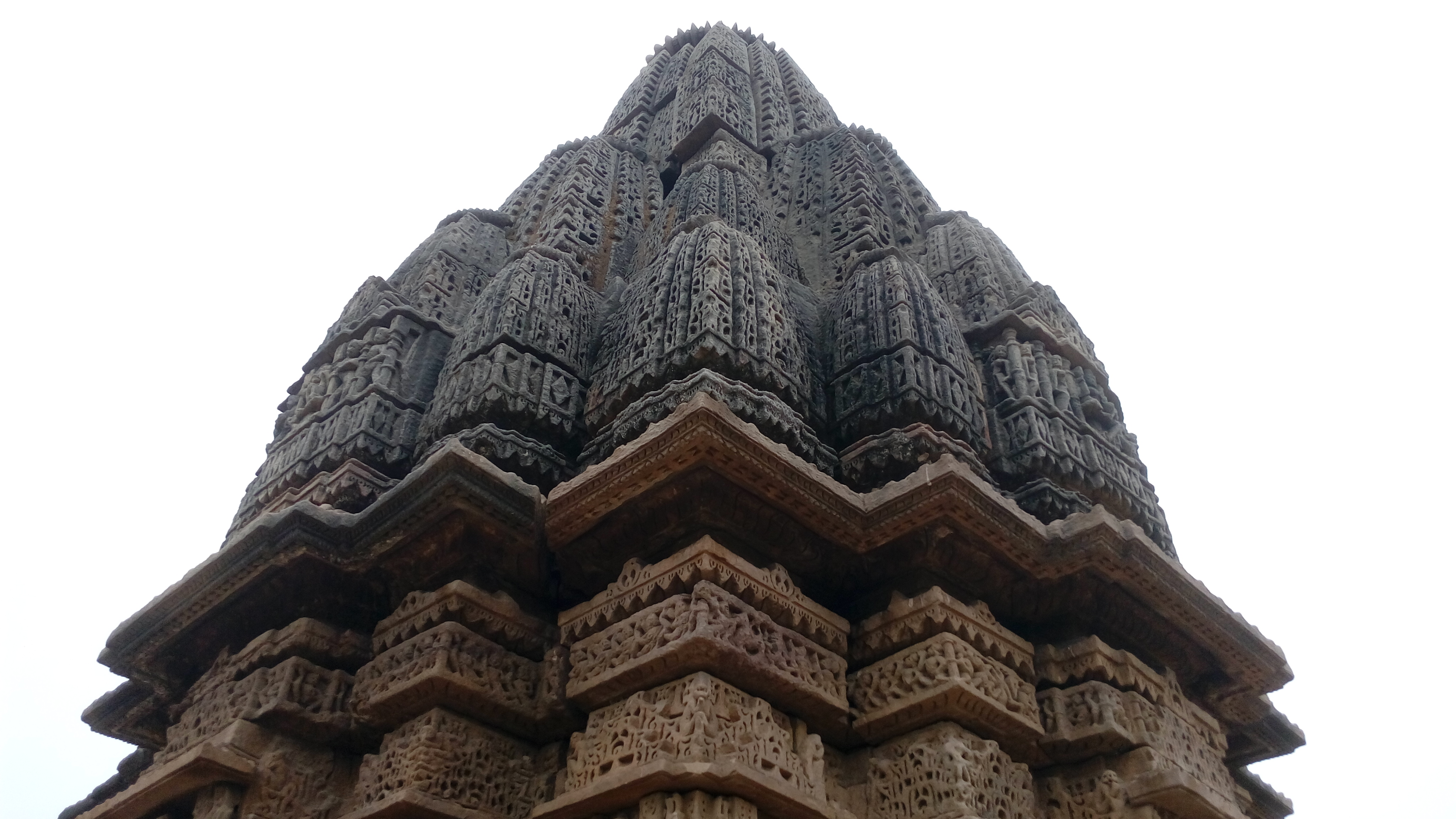
Shikhara

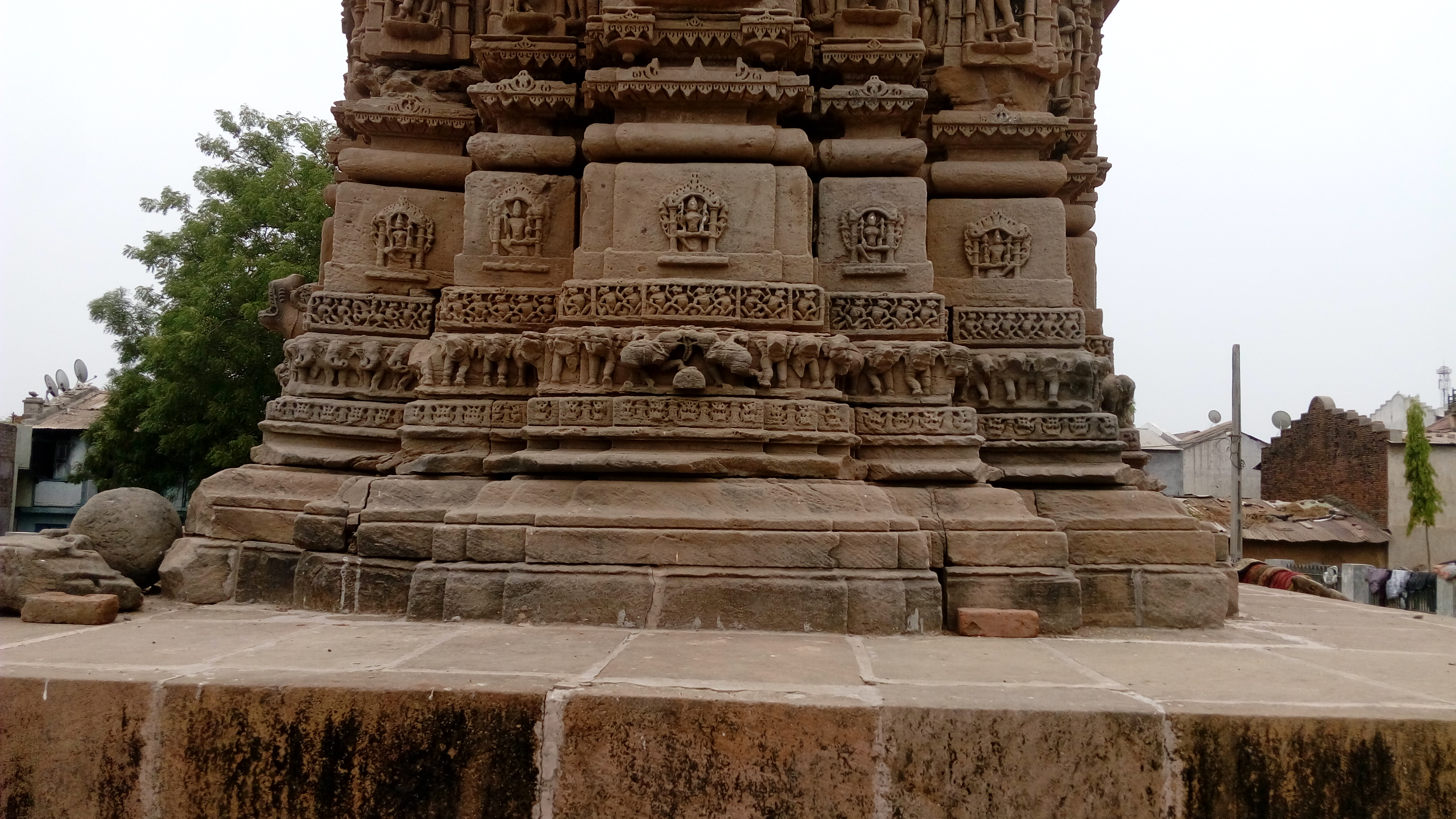
Friezes on the platform

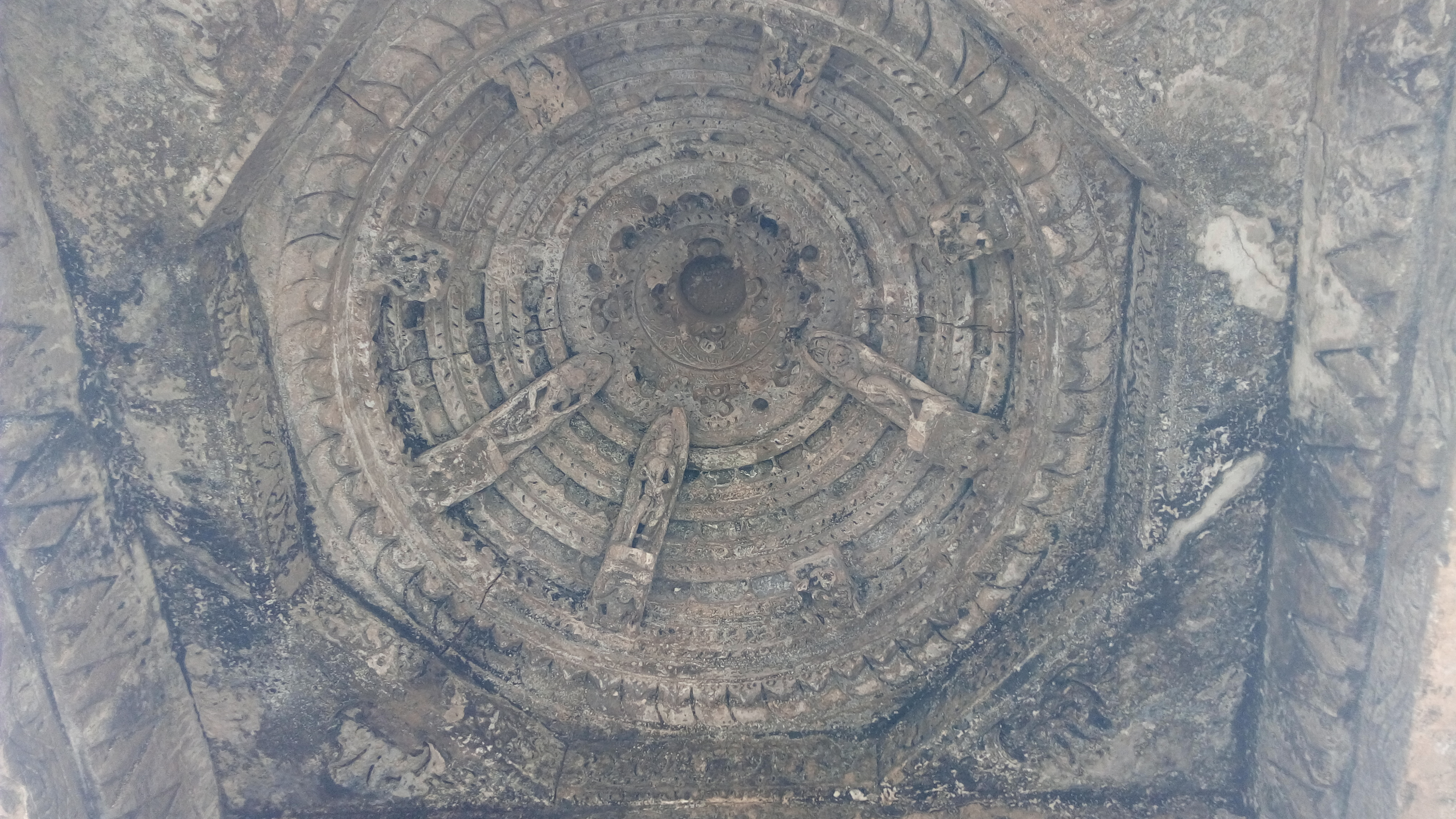
Karotaka (ceiling) of mandapa

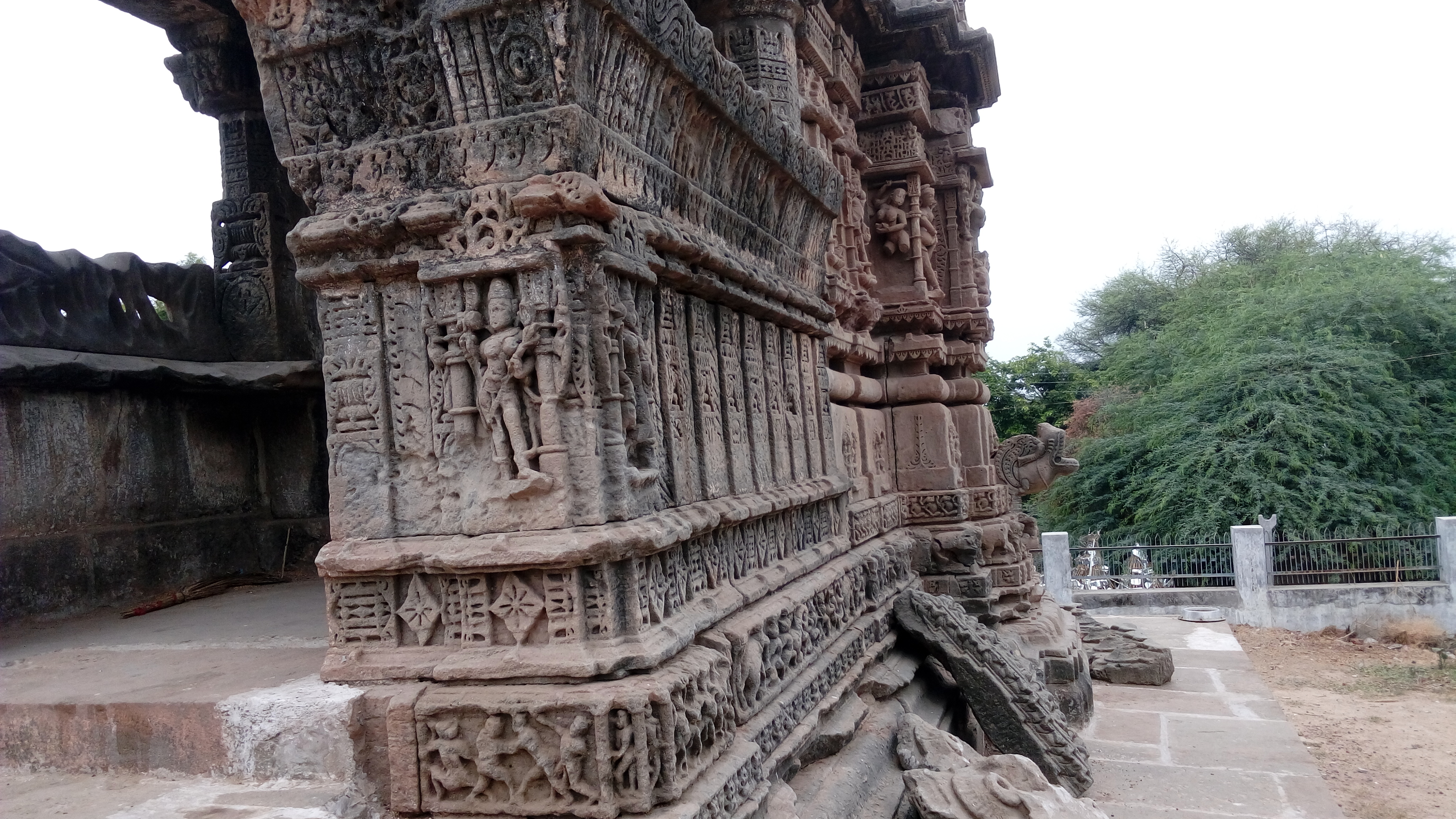
Mouldings of kakshasana (seatings)

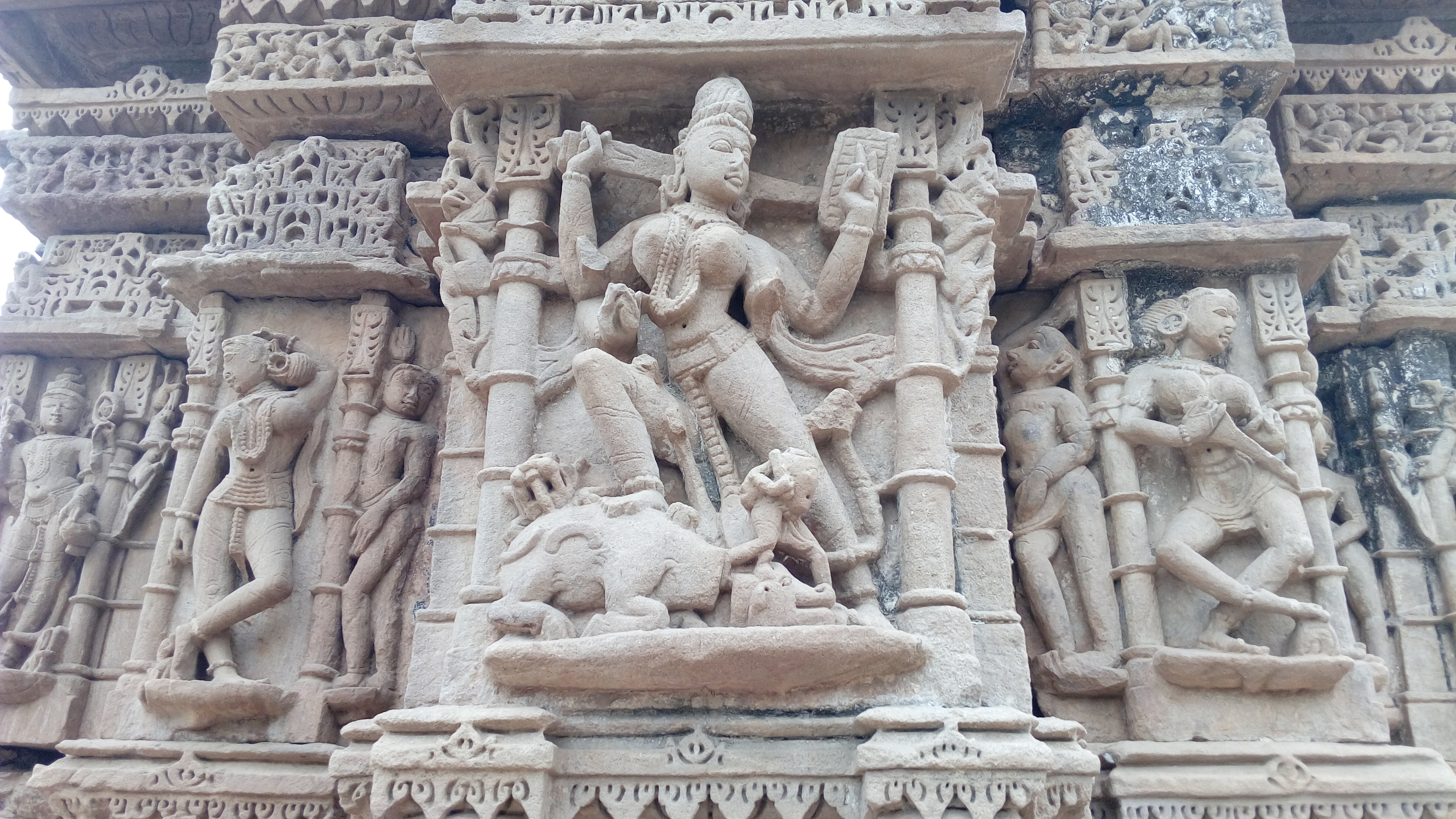
Mahishasurmardini in west niche

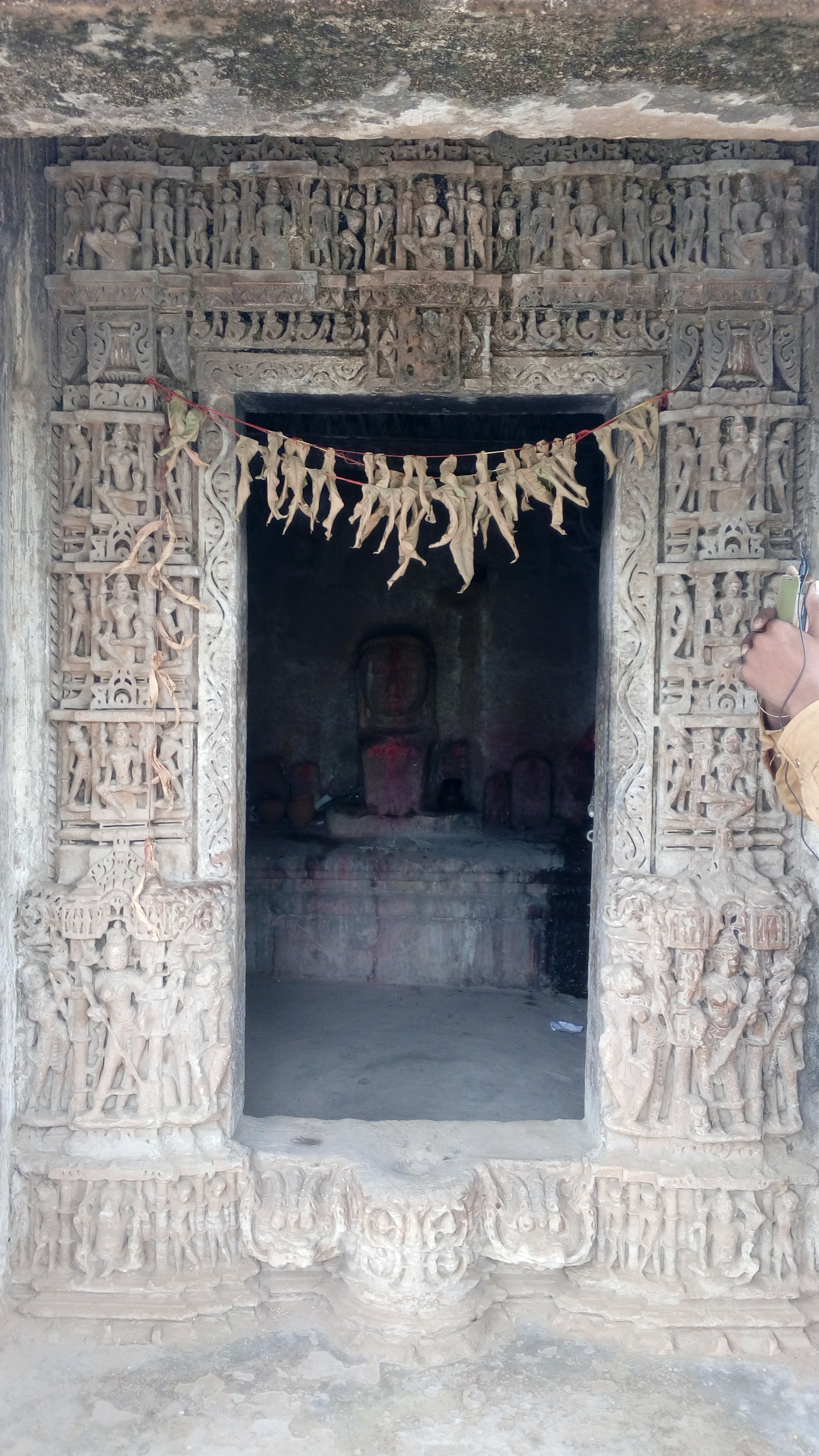
Doorframe of sanctum

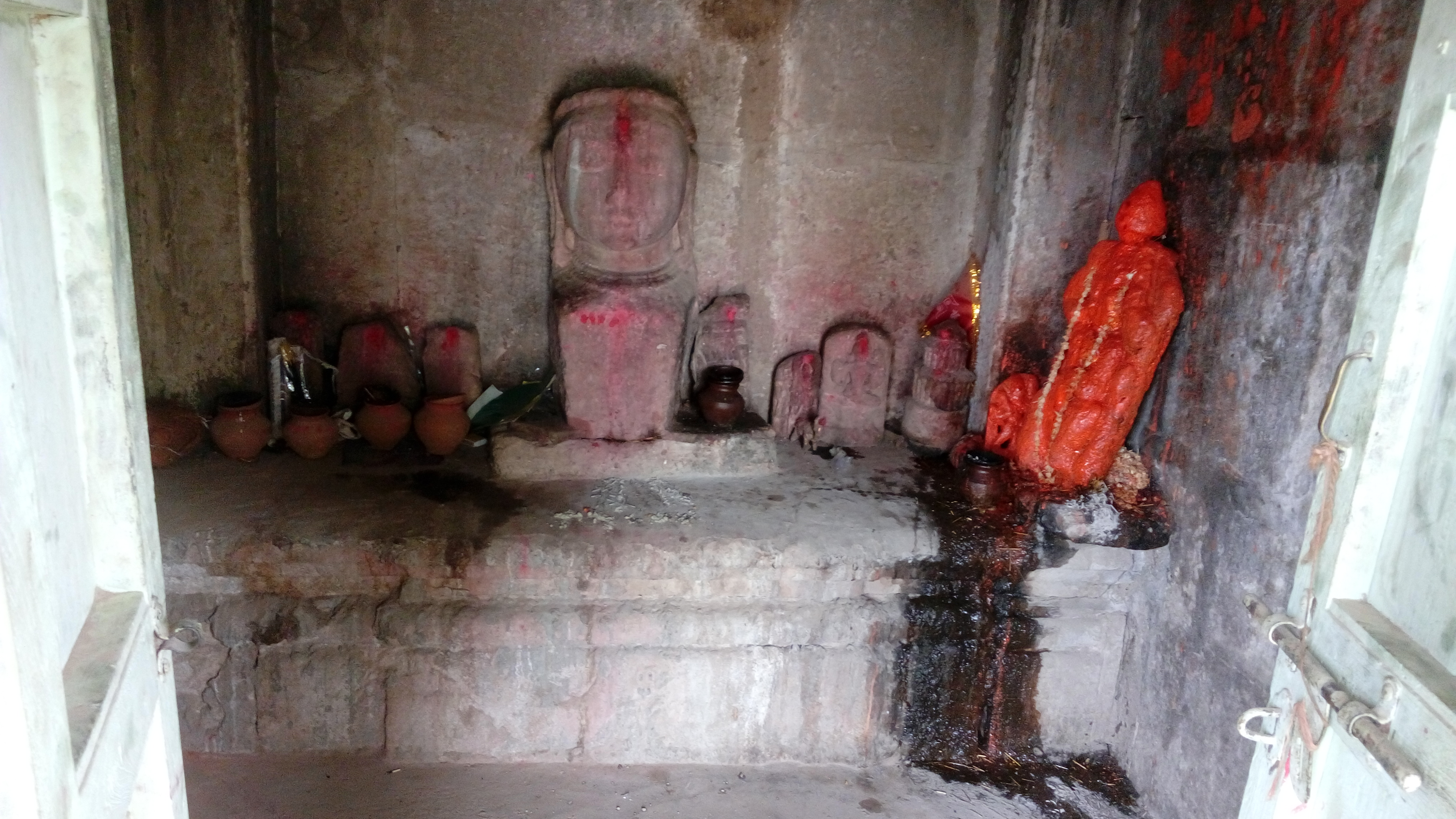
Images in sactum
