= Matri Vav =

- Interactive map of the Matri Vav area

General information
- Architectural style: Indian architecture
- Location: Kankavati, Dhrangadhra Taluka, Surendranagar district, Gujarat, India
- Coordinates: 23.0722°N 71.3542°E
- Completed: Approximately early 17th century

Design and construction
- Architect: Local
- Designations: ASI State Protected Monument No. S-GJ-218

Matri Vav is a stepwell in Kankavati village of Dhrangadhra Taluka of Surendranagar district, Gujarat, India. It was approximately built in early 17th century. The stepped corridor of the stepwell has five pavilion-towers and four intermediate frames. It has decorated niches and well shaft.

== History ==
The dating of the stepwell is difficult due to the lack of decorative or sculptural elements in the stepwell as well as due to simple and basic architectural layout of the stepwell. It was approximately built in early 17th century. It is told that it was built by Rana Bimsinhji. It is a state protected monument (S-GJ-218).

== Architecture ==
The stepwell is built in an artificial lake and thus stays submerged in the water most of time. It was built in the lake because it can provide water during the drought when the lake dries up but the well would supply the water collected below the level of the lake. It has the common features of the stepwells but the stepped corridor is built on the bed of the lake instead of under ground as in the other stepwells. The stone embankment of about one foot is visible from outside. It is built from red sandstone.

It is constructed in an east-west direction with the entrance in the east and the circular well in the west. The entrance is located under the tin-sheet roof. The stepped corridor has five pavilion-towers alternating with four intermediate frames having double bracing crossbars each.

The structure of the stepwell results in an elongated rectangular platform with open spaces; formed by the gaps between the pavilion-towers and of the well, on the top. Thus this platform forms two half-metre wide parallel paths on the side walls of the stepwell which meets at the end in a circular path surrounding the well. These paths also meet each other by the platforms and crossbars of the pavilion-towers and intermediate frames. Some steps from the entrance leads to this platform level while the other steps lead to the stepped corridor going down the well. The pavilion-towers have less decoration while the well shaft is profusely decorated. The circular well has two beams at the top; longer one in the middle supported by brackets which a shorter one supported by corbels. The longer beam has a decoration of small kirtimukha, in middle, on its vertical side.

There are large and beautifully carved niches with decorated crown pieces in both side walls of the each pavilion-towers landings. The first pavilion-tower is converted into a temple and its niches have a statue of Ganesha and a trident carving respectively. The niches in the fourth pavilion-tower have Ganesha and Vishnu respectively. The stepwell is named after Matri, the mother-goddess, whose image is said to be present in the lower storeys of the stepwell. The lower storeys are reached only by narrow ledges on the side walls. The decorative elements include erotic sculptures as well as geometric, natural and mythical motifs. There are shrines of Koteshwar and Matreshwar Mahadev.
