= Lakhpat Gurdwara Sahib =

Gurdwara in Gujarat, India

Coordinates: 23.8261829°N 68.7780873°E

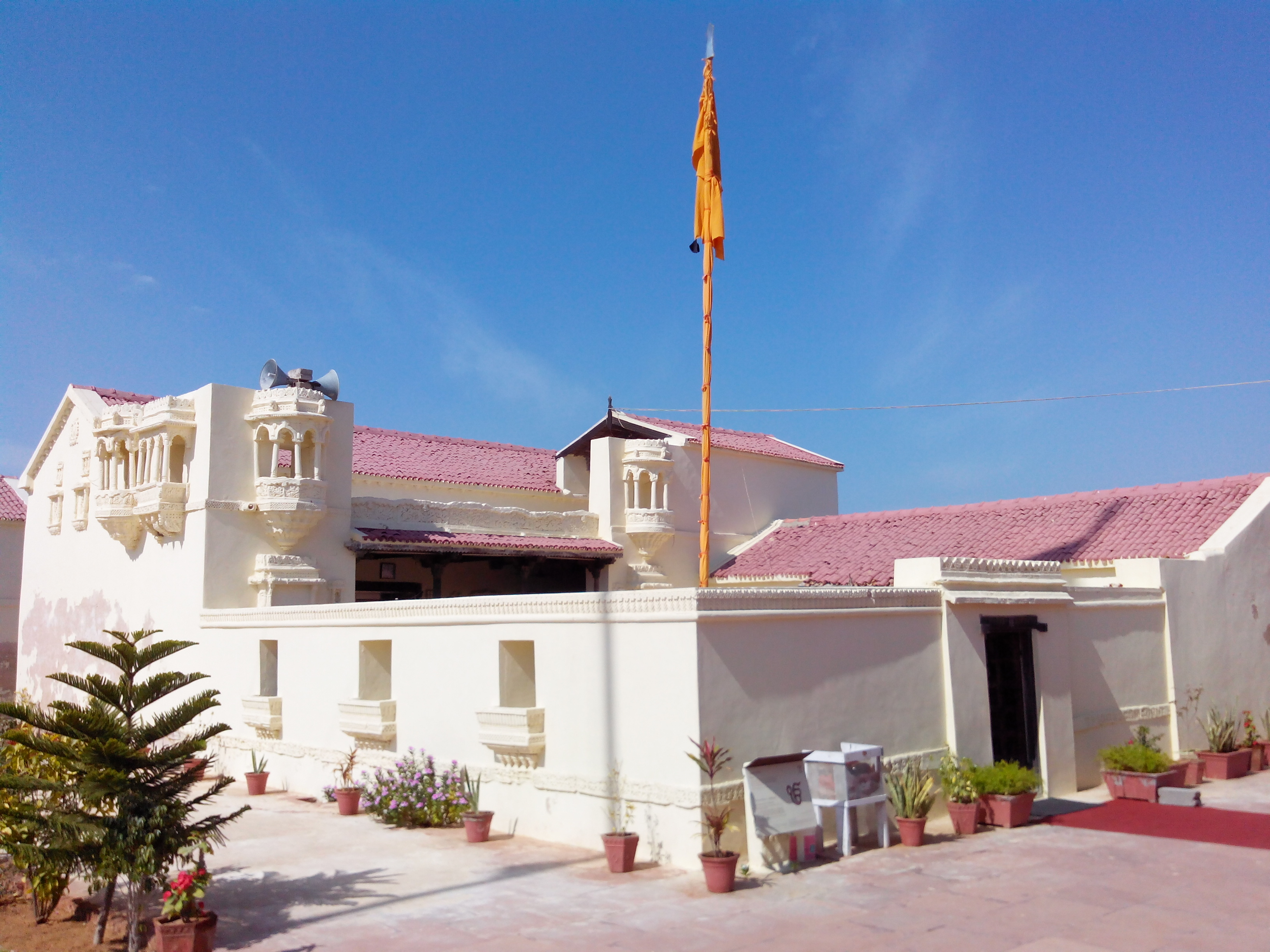
Lakhpat Gurdwara Sahib

Lakhpat Gurdwara Sahib or Gurdwara Pehli Patshahi (Gurdwara of The First Master) is a Gurdwara, a place of worship for the Sikhs, located in Lakhpat of Kutch district, Gujarat, India. Guru Nanak on his way to Mecca stayed over in the town during his second (1506-1513) and fourth (1519-1521) missionary journey called Udasis. It is believed that he had visited the site during his fourth journey. The descendants of the host established Gurdwara here in early 19th century. This Gurdwara have his relics like wooden footwear and palkhi (cradle) as well as manuscripts and markings of two important heads of Udasi sect. The site is worshiped by the Udasi sect and initially it was maintained by them. Now it is maintained by local Sikh community and Gurdwara Shri Guru Nanak Singh Sabha of Gandhidham. The Gurdwara is the State Protected Monument (S-GJ-65) by the state archeological department. It has won the UNESCO Asia-Pacific Award in 2004 of Distinction for conservation after the earthquake in 2001.
