= Chitrod =

Coordinates: 23.409244°N 70.677774°E

Chitrod is a village near Rapar of Kutch district of Gujarat, India.

== Places of interest ==
About a mile to the north of village, the ruins of four temples and a reservoir built by the Kathis, who, about the year 1500, were settled here in considerable numbers. One of the temples, probably dedicated to Mahishasuri, was built of fine stone with excellent sculpture. The temples are in ruins, and most of the materials have been carried away. About a mile to the east are the remains of a pretty large Kathi town, with among them the ruins of a small plain temple of Mahadev bearing date 1502 (Samvat 1559).
