= Kadia Dungar Caves =

Buddhist caves in Gujarat, India

Kadia Dungar caves
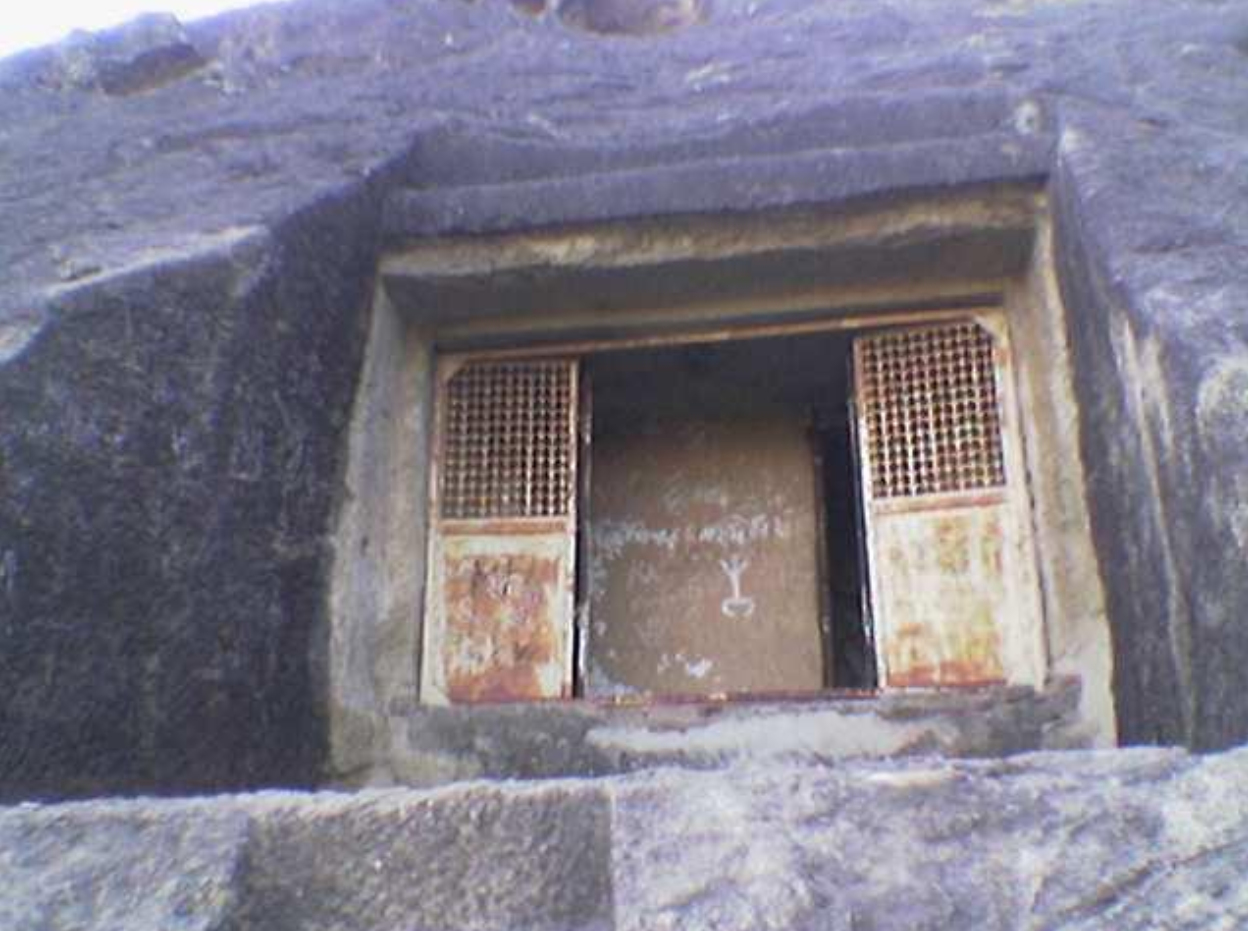
- Kadia Dungar caves entrance.

- Location within India Location within Gujarat
- Coordinates: 21.673742°N 73.272278°E

Kadia Dungar Caves are located at Kadia Dungar near Zazpor village of Zagadiya Taluka of in Bharuch district of the Indian state of Gujarat. The group has seven caves carved out in 1st and 2nd century AD on the mountain. The group includes sculpture of monolithic lion pillars. An architecture of cave shows vihara style construction. The site has a brick stupa at the foot of a mountain. The caves were carved out in 1st or 2nd century AD, influenced by Buddhist architecture.

== Gallery ==
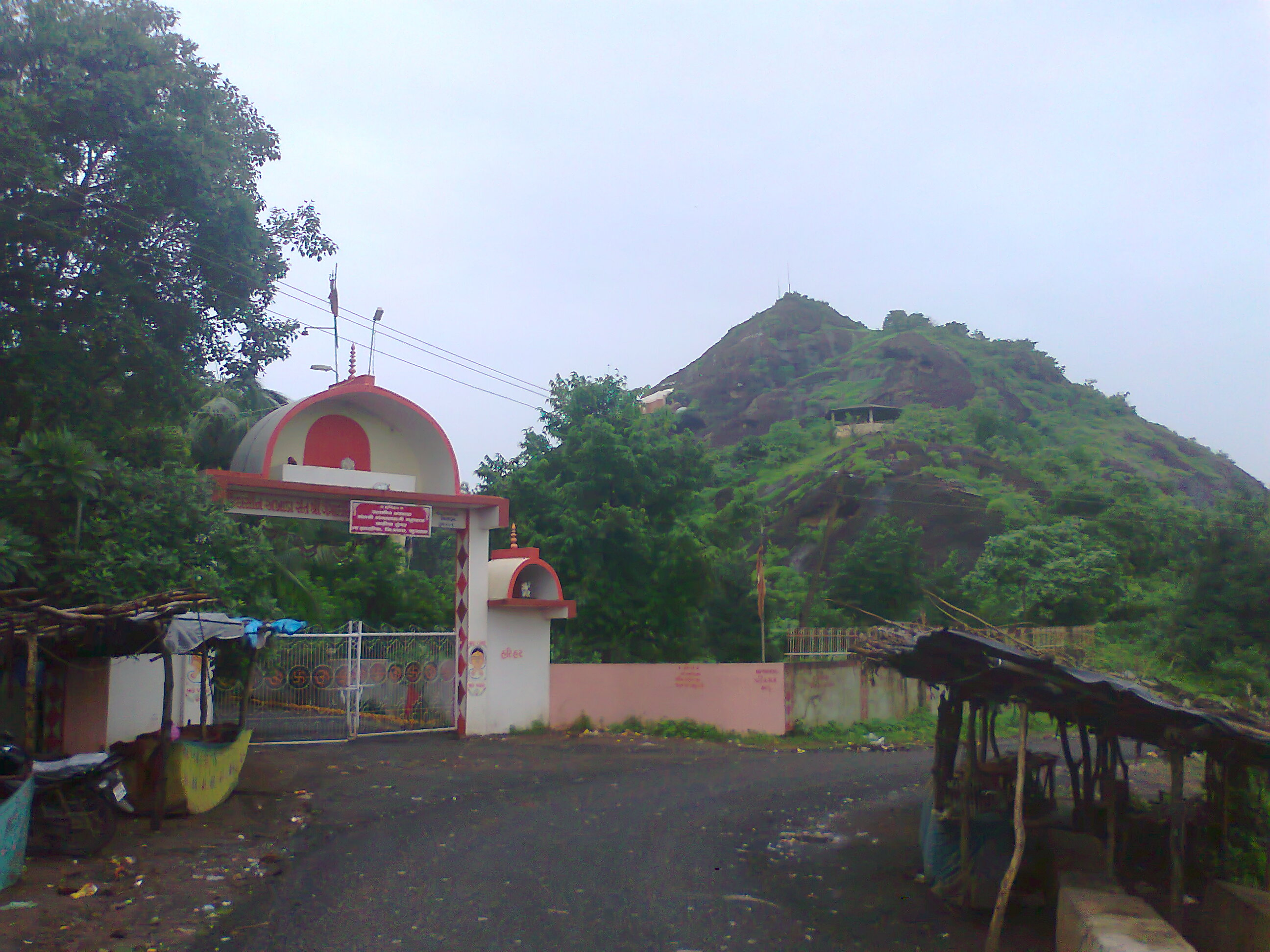
Kadya Dungar hill from Udasin Akhada ashram

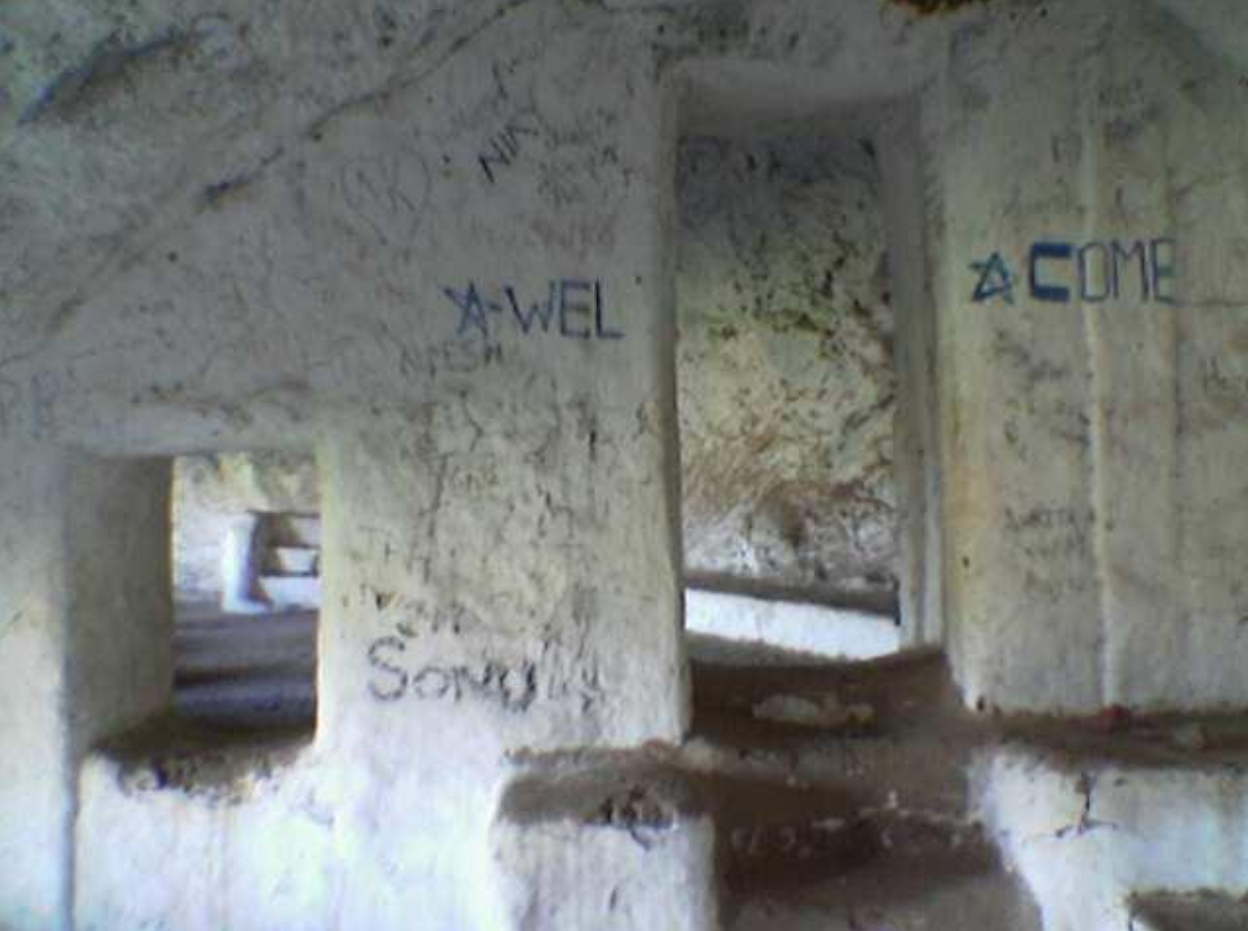
Kadia Dungar caves inside.

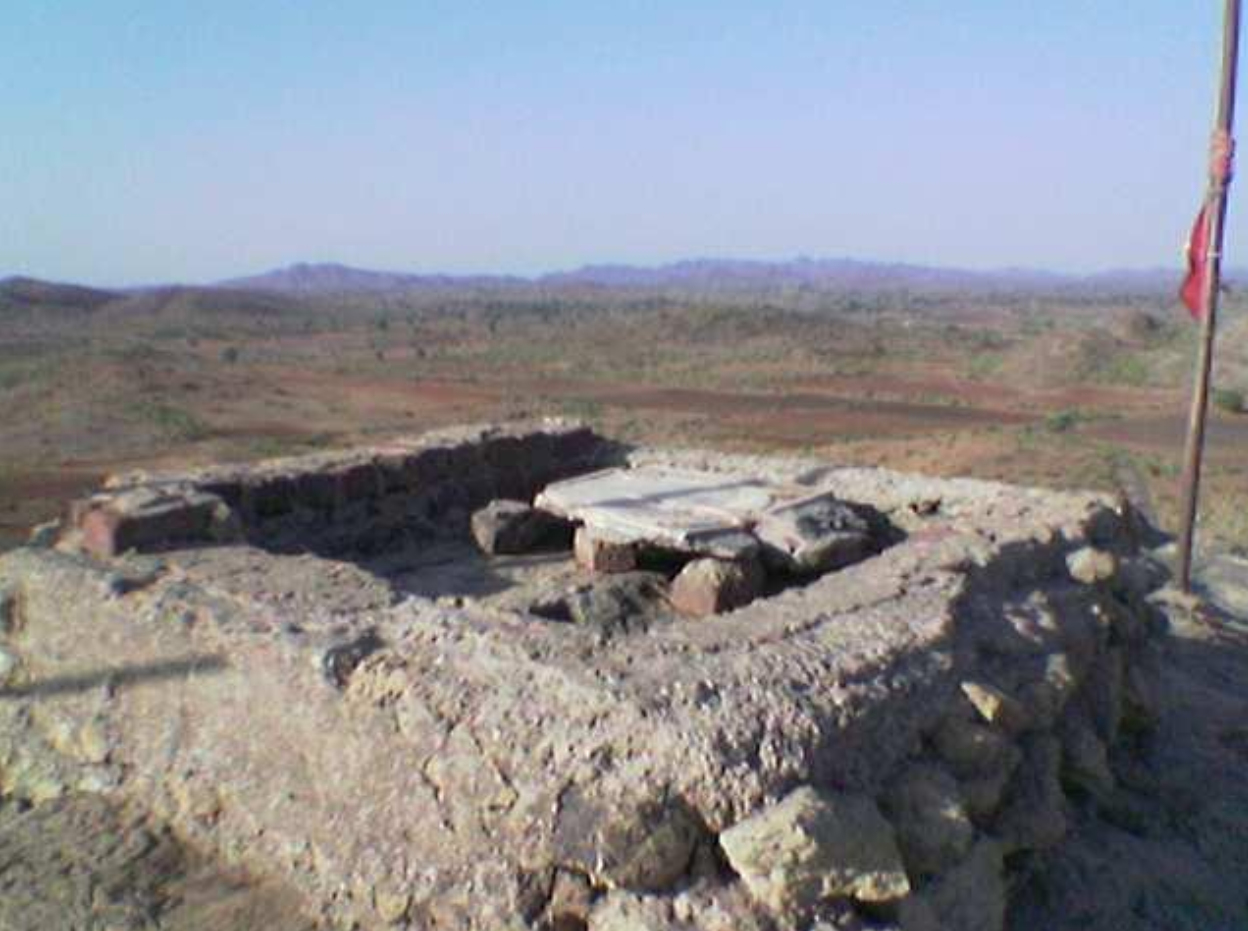
Kadia Dungar caves landmark.

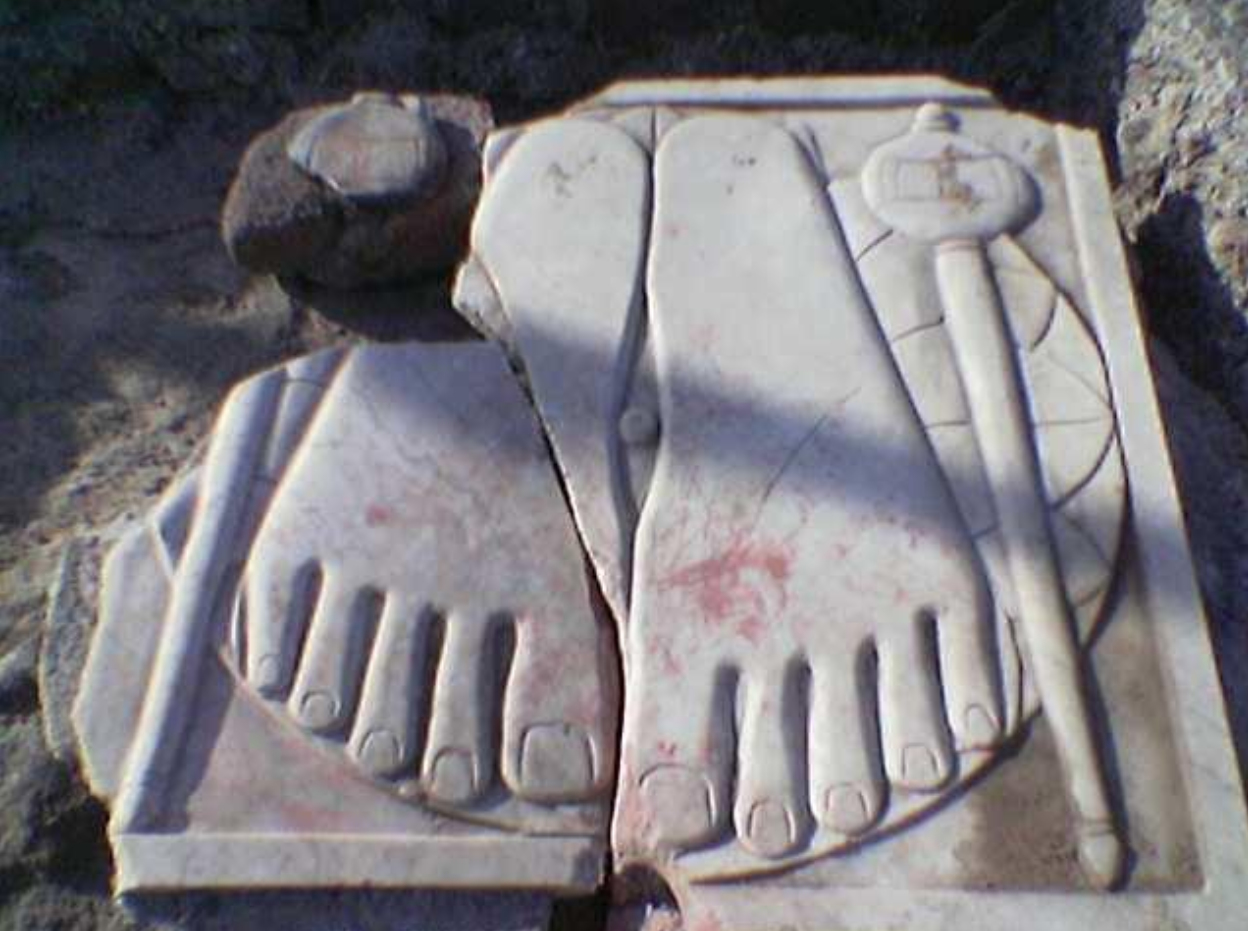
Kadia Dungar caves Buddha feet.
