= Padharia =

Ethnic group in Gujarat, India

Padharia / Padhariya
Regions with significant populations
- Gujarat, India

Languages
- Gujarati, Kutchi

Religion
- Hindu 100%

Padhariya or Padharia is a tribe found in the Saurashtra, Kutch, Banaskantha, Rewakantha and Dang regions of Gujarat, India.
