= Kasara, Gujarat =

Village in Gujarat, India

Coordinates: 23.9086332°N 71.8892453°E

Kasara is a village in Kankrej Taluka of Banaskantha district in Gujarat, India.

== History ==
Kasara was an estate of Thara which was under Palanpur Agency of Bombay Presidency, which in 1925 became the Banas Kantha Agency. After Independence of India in 1947, Bombay Presidency was reorganized in Bombay State. When Gujarat state was formed in 1960 from Bombay State, it fell under Banaskantha district of Gujarat.

== Place of interest ==
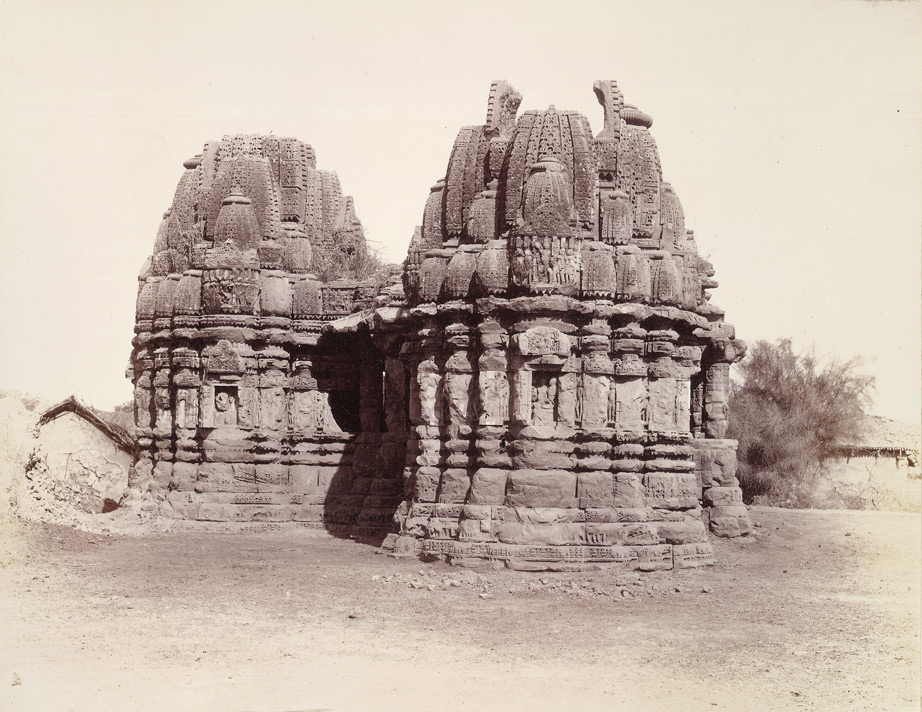
Ruins of a Hindu temple at Kasara, Gujarat

There is an old Vishnavite temple, built in layers of different coloured sandstone highly carved and ornamented. The carvings and mouldings have suffered much, but, except the upper part of the tower, the building is wonderfully preserved. Besides its layers of different coloured stone, the building is of peculiar construction with a central porch, mandap, and three sides as well as the usual back shrine. Its greatest length is about thirty feet. The original image of Vishnu in his four-handed, chaturbhuji, form, is said to have been carried away by the Emperor Alauddin Khalji (1295–1315). The present building is probably from 400 to 500 years old. According to local story it stands on the site of a temple built by Gandharvasen, the heaven-born father of Vikramaditya (56 B.C.), who, in memory of having once borne the form of an ass, is said to have introduced in all his works an ornament in the likeness of an ass-hoof. The ass-hoof ornament is freely used in this Kasara temple. It is not peculiar to Gandharvasen' s works, being really the same as the ' Chaitya window ' ornament common in early Buddhist and Brahmanic buildings. The temple is now used as Shiva temple and is State Protected Monument (S-GJ-10).
