= Khambhalida Caves =

Buddhist caves in Jetpur, India

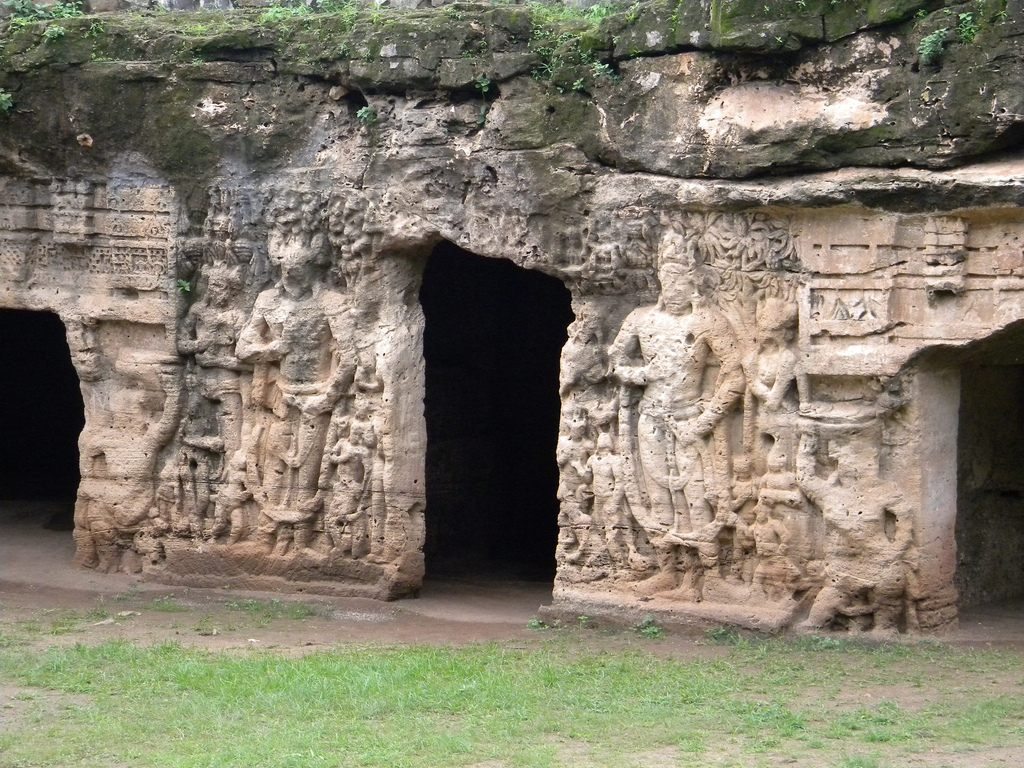
- Khambhalida Buddhist caves, Gujarat.

- Location within India Location within Gujarat
- Coordinates: 21.7753°N 70.7078°E

Khambhalida Caves, are three Buddhist caves located in Jetpur in Gujarat, India.

== Architecture ==
Archeologist P. P. Pandya discovered these Buddhist caves in 1958. These caves are maintained by the Archaeology Department of Gujarat state.

The caves are situated at the foot of small hillocks on the banks of a spring. They are carved out of limestone rocks. There are three caves, the central one contains the stupa which is known as chaitya cave. There are two sculptures of Bodhisattva on the either sides of the gate of the chaitya cave. On the left, the figure is probably Padmapani under Ashoka-like tree with a female companion and five attendants. There is a yaksha-like dwarf on the left of it holding a basket. The figure on the right is probably Vajrapani under Ashoka-like tree with similar attendants. The broad belts of female are similar to that of figures at Uparkot Caves of Junagadh. They are comparable to late Kushana-Kshatapa period sculptures elsewhere as well as features some late Andhra mannerism. The caves are believed to have come into existence in the 4th or 5th century AD.

Another cave on the left is deep and huge and is open in the front. It may have been used for meditation by the monks.

There are 15 small caves situated near the Khambhalida caves. They are probably carved by the Lesser Vehicle branch of Buddhism.

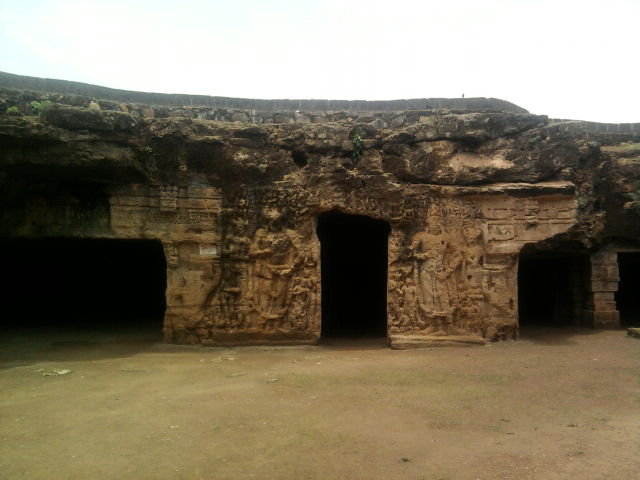
The caves

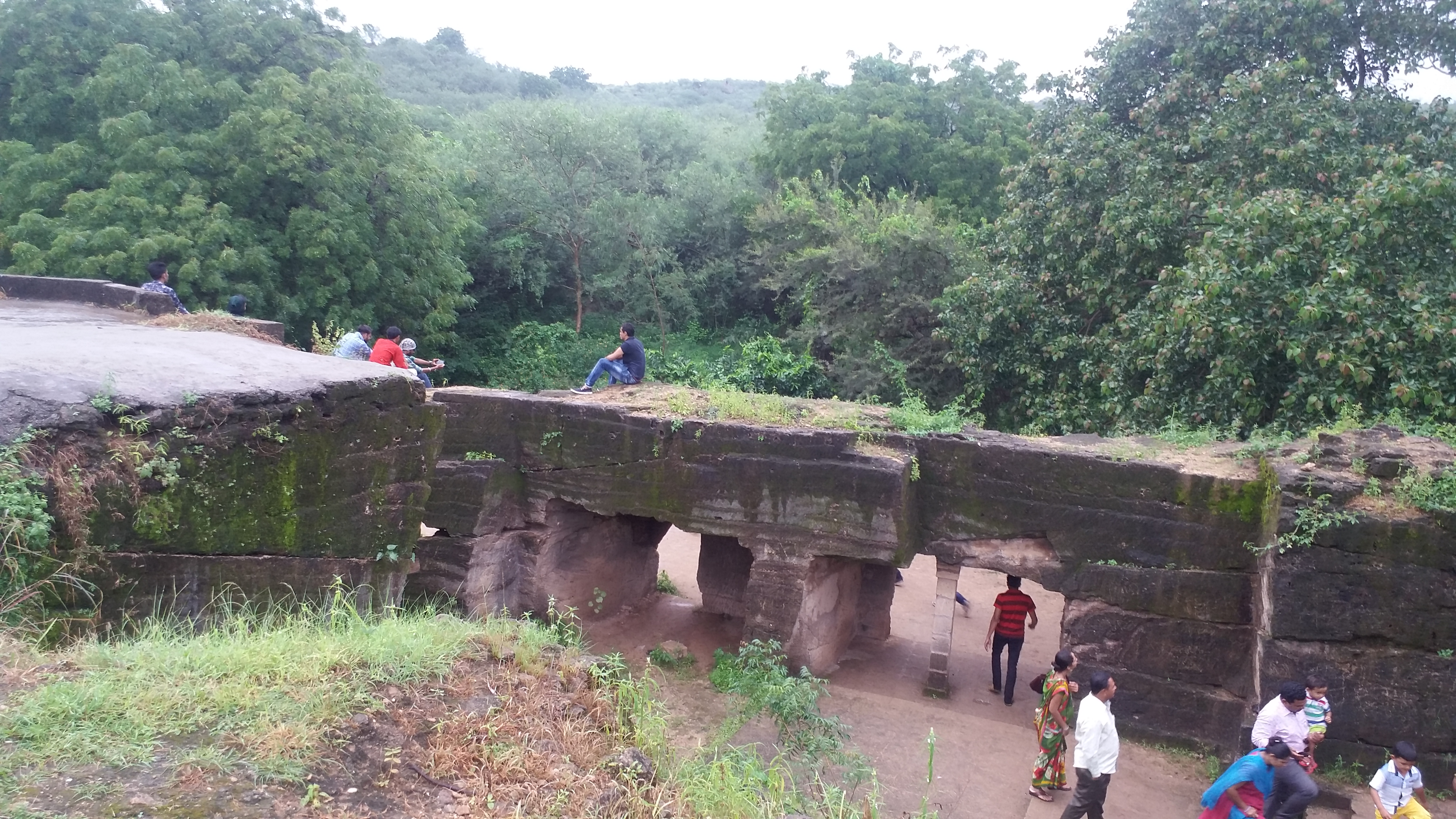
The caves

== Other information ==
A modern large Buddhist temple complex is coming up near by.

It is said that for centuries Gir Forest extended till Khambhalida Village.
