= Odadar =

- village
- Location in Gujarat, India Odadar (India)
- Coordinates: 21°34′0″N 69°40′0″E
- Country: India
- State: Gujarat
- District: Porbandar

Languages
  - Official: Gujarati, Hindi
- Time zone: UTC+5:30 (IST)
- Vehicle registration: GJ
- Nearest city: Porbandar
- Website: gujaratindia.com

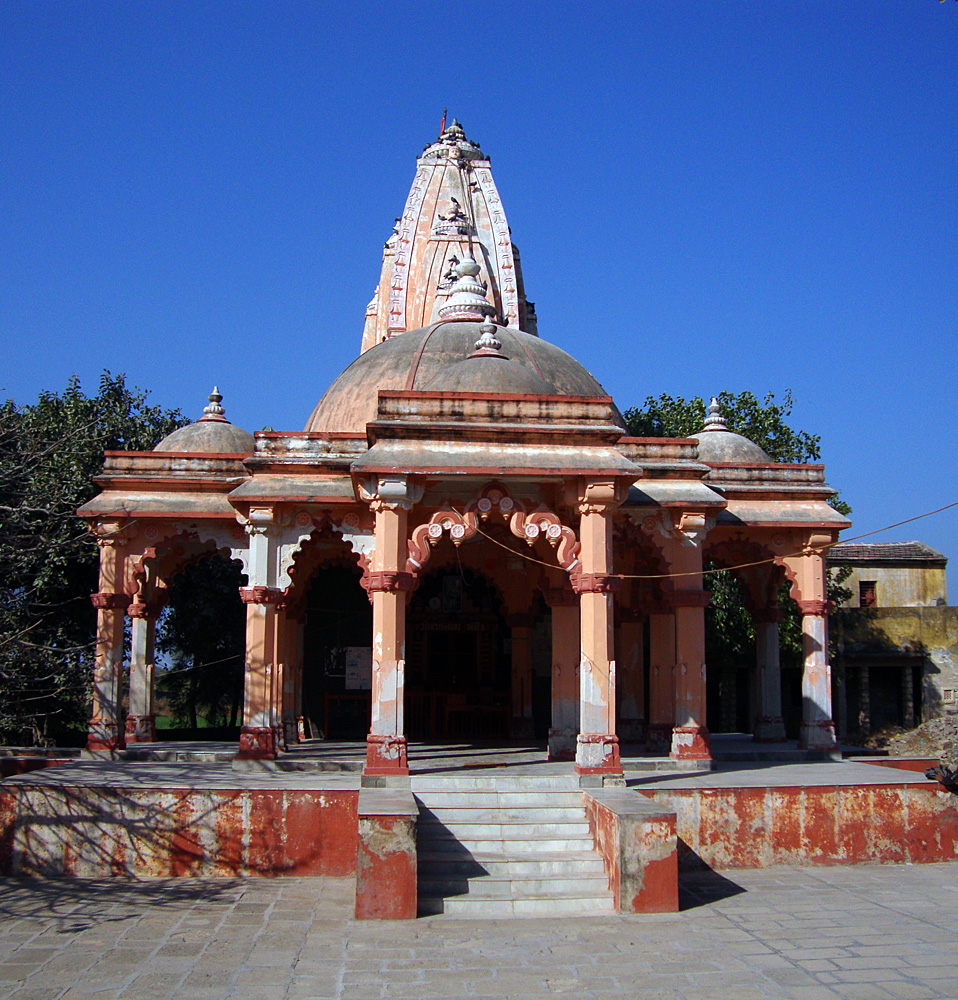
Gorakhnath temple. At Odadar village

Odadar is a coastal village 10 kilometres (6.2 mi) from Porbandar, in the state of Gujarat, India.

In 2015, farmers from Odadar signed a memorandum requesting the district collector of Porbandar to continue the ban on fishing in Karli-Gosabara reservoir.
