= Mahabat Maqbara complex =

Mausoleums in Junagadh, Gujarat, India

Mahabat Maqbara
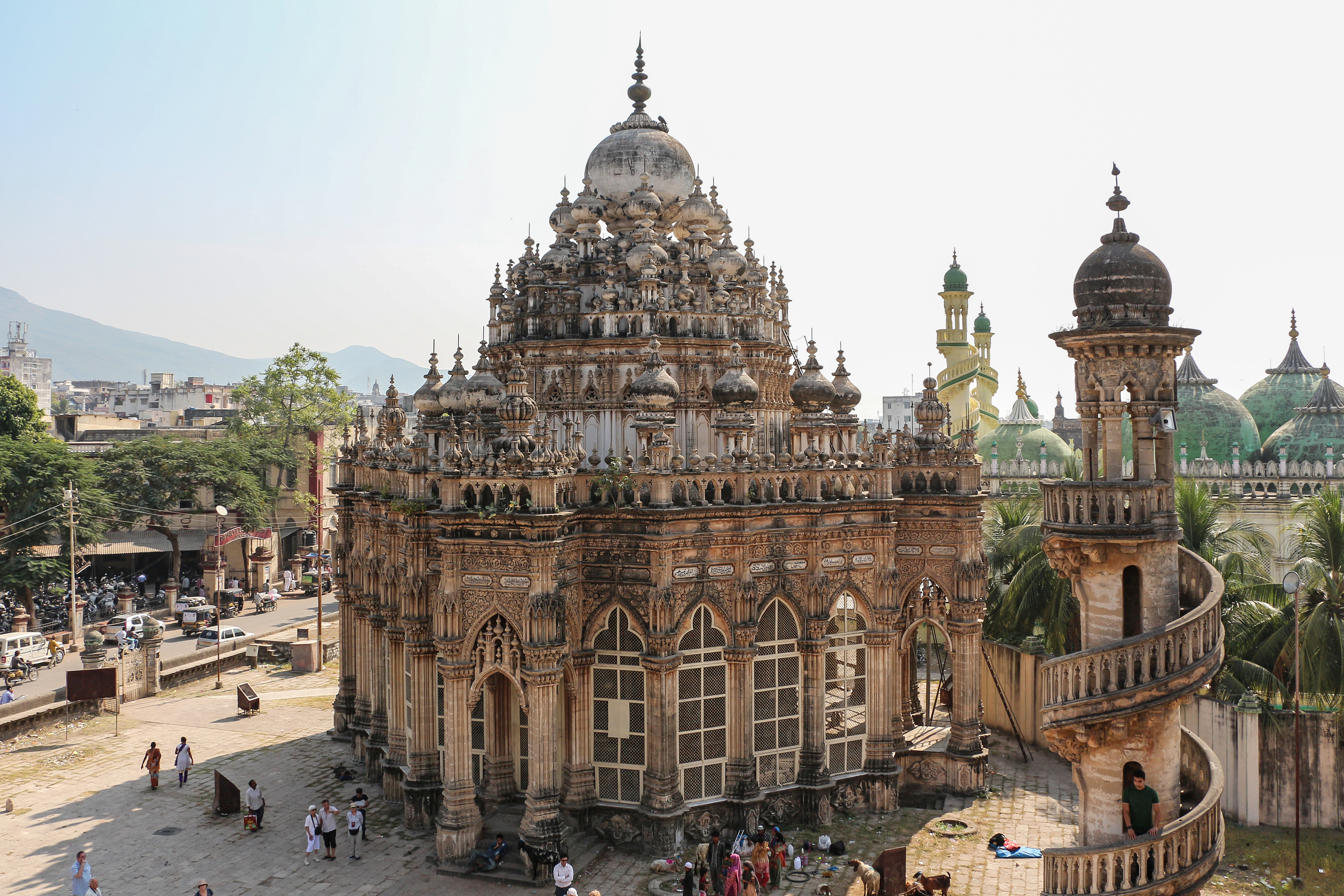
- Tomb of Mahabat Khan
- Location: Junagadh, Gujarat, India
- Coordinates: 21.5272°N 70.46°E
- Type: Mausoleum
- Beginning date: 1878
- Completion date: 1892
- Dedicated to: Mahabat Khan II

Mahabat Maqbara and Bahauddin Maqbra are mausoleums in Junagadh, Gujarat, India. They were completed in 1892 and 1896 respectively and are dedicated to Mahabat Khan II, the Nawab of Junagadh State, and his minister Bahauddin Hussain Bhar respectively.

== History ==
The Nawabs of Babi dynasty ruled the erstwhile Junagadh State. The construction of the Mahabat Maqbara was started in 1878 by Nawab Mahabat Khan II (1851–82) and ended in 1892 during the reign of Nawab Bahadur Khan III (1882–92). It houses the grave of Mahabat Khan II. It is a State Protected Monument under the Gujarat Ancient Monuments and Archaeological Sites and Remains Act, 1965.

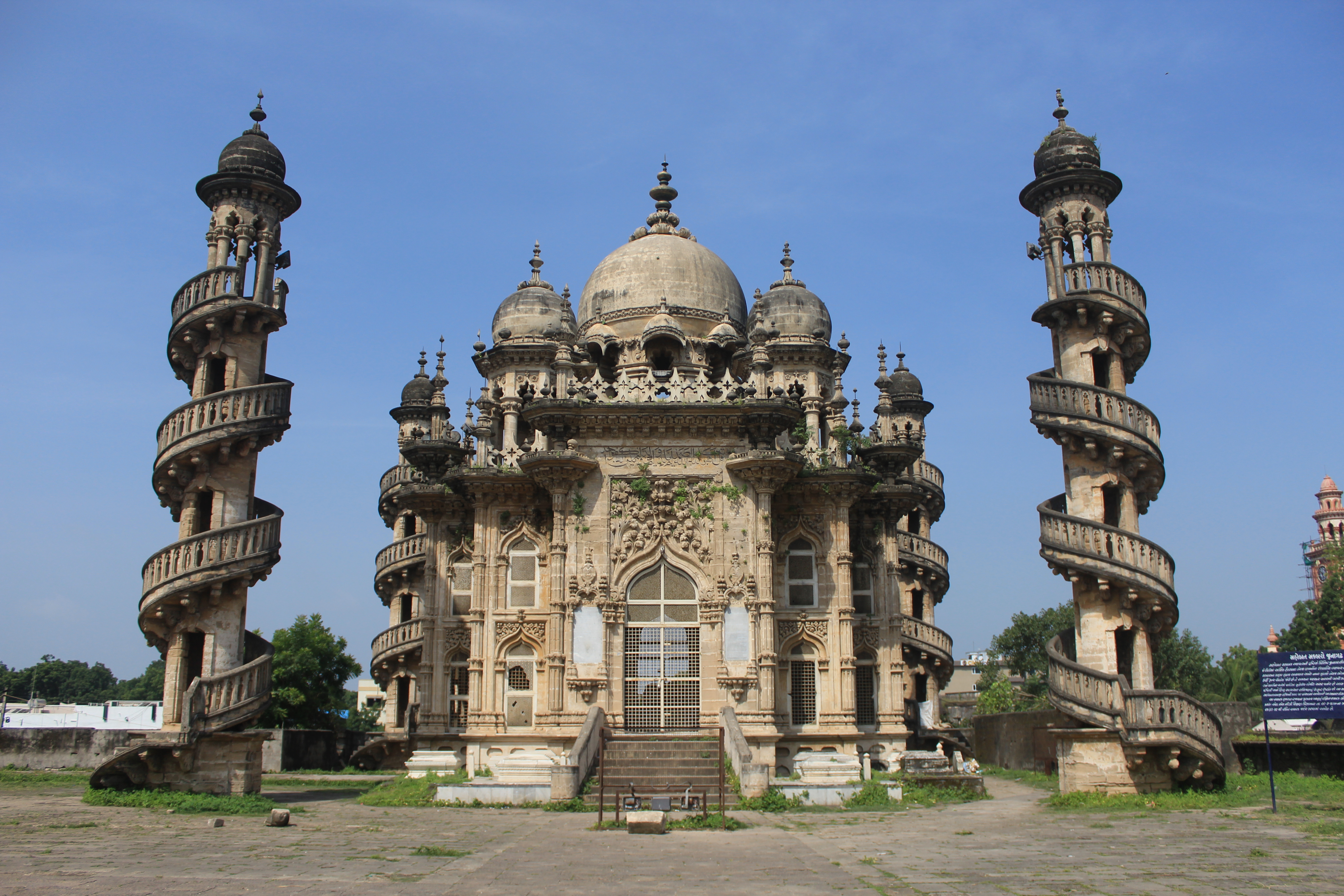
Bahauddin Maqbara

The adjacent mausoleum in north was constructed by Mahabat Khan II's vizier (minister), Sheikh Bahauddin Hussain Bhar, with his own funds during 1891–1896. It is known as the Bahauddin Maqbara or Vazir's Maqbara.

== Architecture ==
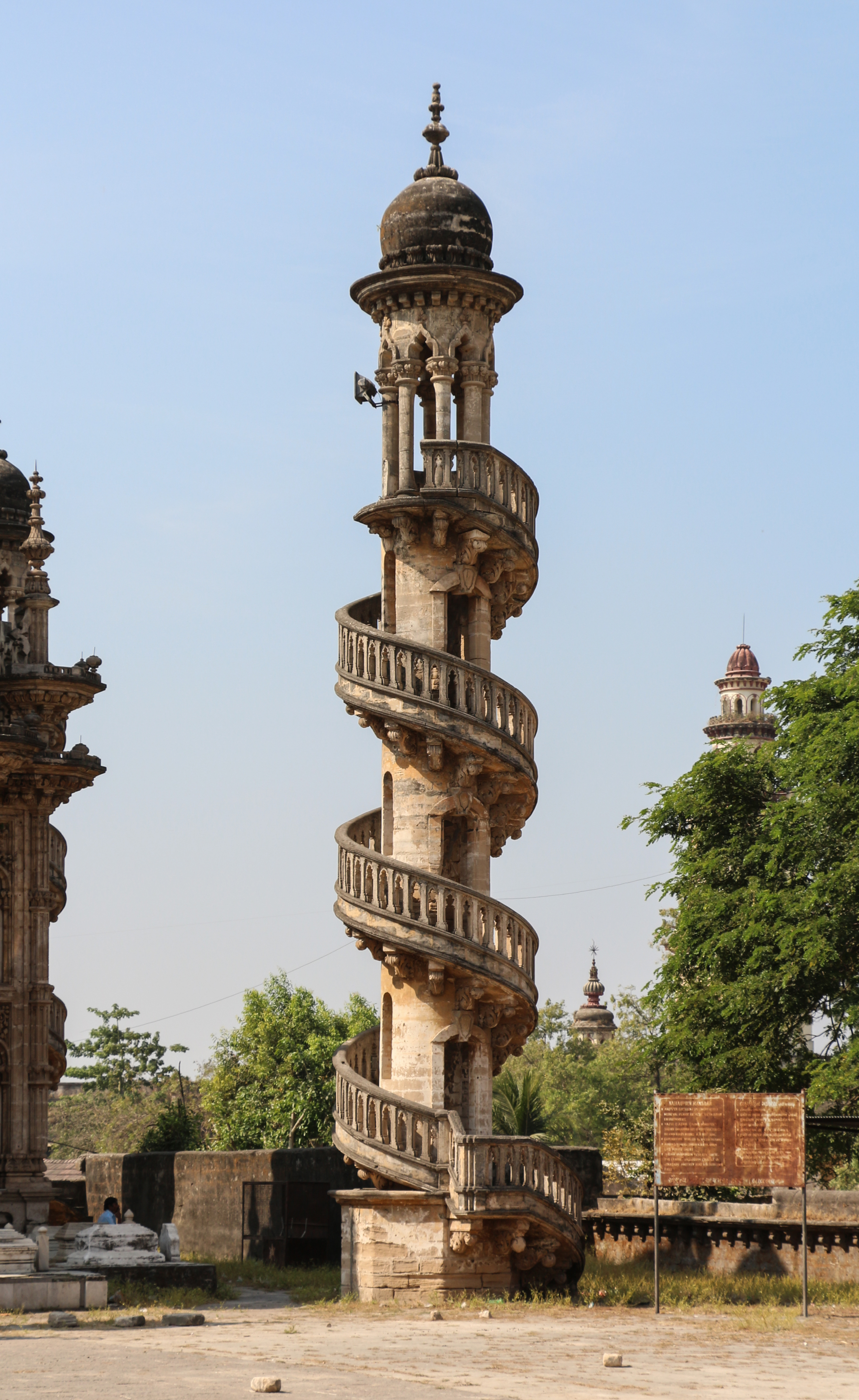
A minaret with winding staircase around it.

These mausoleums are known for amalgamation of Indo-Islamic styles (mainly Gujarat Sultanate and Mughal) with considerable European (Gothic) influence.

These mausoleums have the carvings on its inner and outer façades and arches with yellowish light brown exterior. They have onion-shaped domes, French windows, sculptures, marble tracery work, marble columns, marble jalis and silver doorways. The minarets on four sides of one of these mausoleums has winding staircases around them.

The Jama Mosque is located nearby with similar architectural style.

== See also ==
- Uparkot Fort
- Uparkot Caves
- Jumma Masjid, Uparkot
- Junagadh rock inscription of Rudradaman
