= Jumma Masjid, Uparkot =

Former mosque in Junagadh, Gujarat, India

Jumma Masjid
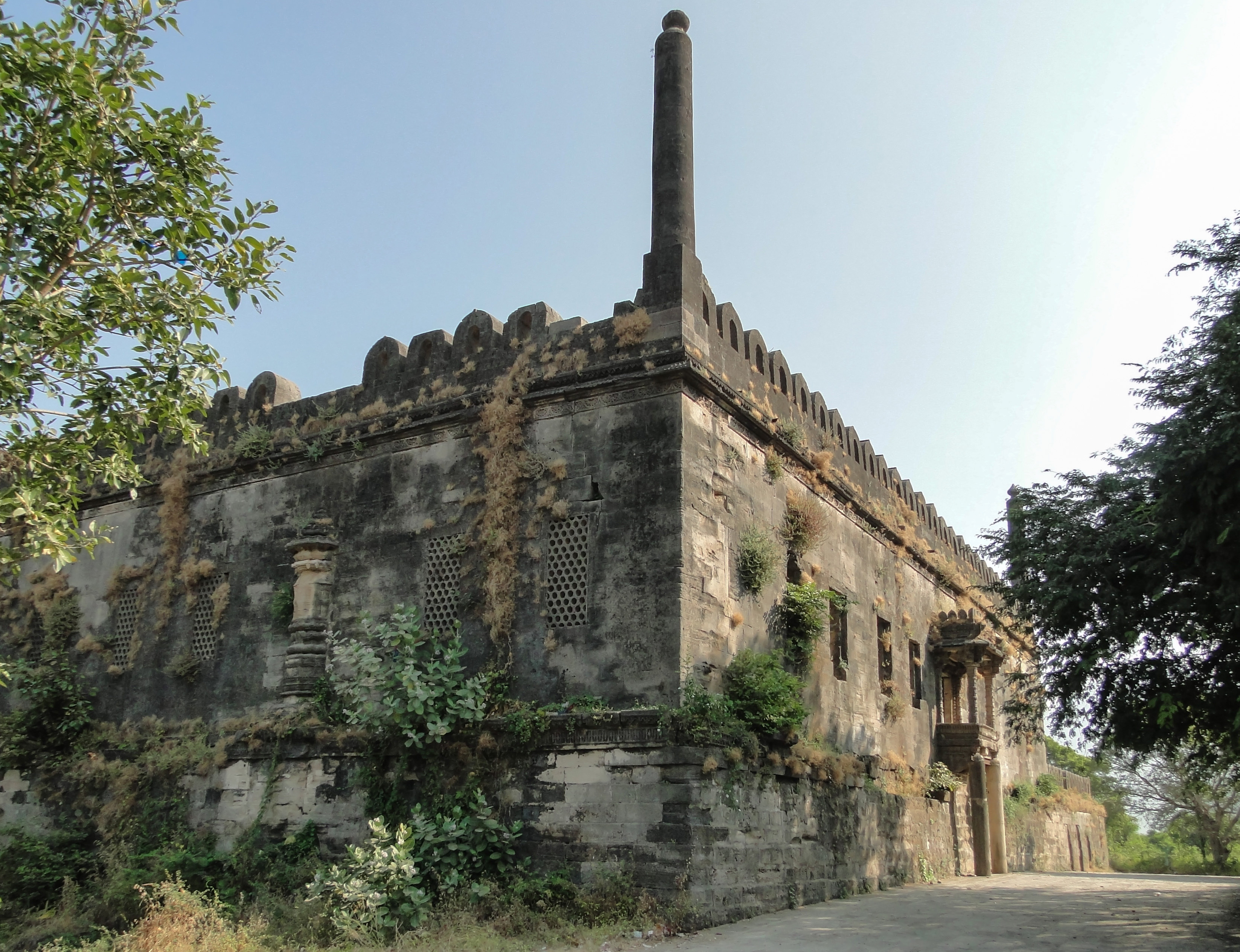
- The ruins of the mosque with a column on its corner

Religion
- Affiliation: Islam (former)
- Ecclesiastical or organizational status: Mosque (former)
- Status: Abandoned (partial ruinous state)

Location
- Location: Uparkot Fort, Junagadh, Gujarat
- Country: India
- Interactive map of Jumma Masjid
- Coordinates: 21°31′29″N 70°28′12″E

Architecture
- Type: Palace / Fort
- Funded by: Mahmud Begada
- Completed: 15th century
- Materials: Brick
- Building details
- Alternative names: Ranakdevi Mahal

General information
- Renovated: 2020
- Operator: Government of Gujarat

Design and construction
- Designations: State Protected Monument (S-GJ-115)

The Jumma Masjid or Jama Masjid is a former Friday mosque, now in partial ruins, in Uparkot Fort in Junagadh, in the state of Gujarat, India. The mosque was built in 15th century by converting a temple or a palace identified as Ranakdevi Mahal by local people and the Archaeological Survey of India. The structure is a Protected Monument in the state of Gujarat.

== History ==
The Jumma Masjid (Friday Mosque) was built by Mahmud Begada in 15th century following capture of Junagadh in 1472. It is evidently constructed from the materials of a Hindu or Jain temple or previously existing palace. The palace is now identified as Ranakdevi Mahal by local people attributing it to Ranakdevi, the legendary queen of Chudasama ruler Khengara.

The Jumma Masjid and cannons are enlisted as the State Protected Monument (S-GJ-115) by Archaeology Department of the Government of Gujarat. In 2020, the Gujarat tourism department placed a board marking the place as Jami Masjid–Ranakdevi Mahal. The local Rajput community objected to the identification as a mosque and protested. Later the board was removed.

As of 2020, the former mosque was being restored under Uperkot Fort Restoration Project of the Government of Gujarat.

== Architecture ==
The mosque is built on a brick platform and looks like a citadel. It has solid thick walls and a slim column rising from a corner. The column looks more like a turret than a minaret. The mosque was never finished and the part of its hall is open to sky. There is a staircase leading to terraced roof. It was reinstalled during the restoration.

=== Cannons ===
Facing the walls, outside the mosque, there is a huge bell-metal cannon called Nilam which has 25-centimetre (10 in) bore, and is 5.2 metres (17 ft) long and 1.42 metres (4 ft 8 in) round at the mouth. This cannon was brought from Diu, where it was left by the Ottoman admiral Suleyman Pasha following their defeat in siege of Diu (1538) while assisting Gujarat Sultanate against their struggle with Portuguese. There is an Arabic inscription at the muzzle, which may be translated: "The order to make this cannon, to be used in the service of the Almighty, was given by the Sultan of Arabia and Persia, Sultan Sulaiman, son of Salim Khan. May his triumph be glorified, to punish the enemies of the State and of the Faith, in the capital of Egypt, 1531." At the breech is inscribed: "The work of Muhamman, the son of Hamzah." Another large cannon called Kadanal, also from Diu, in the southern portion of the fort, is 4.0 metres (13 ft) long, and has a muzzle 1.2 metres (4 ft) in diameter.

== Gallery ==
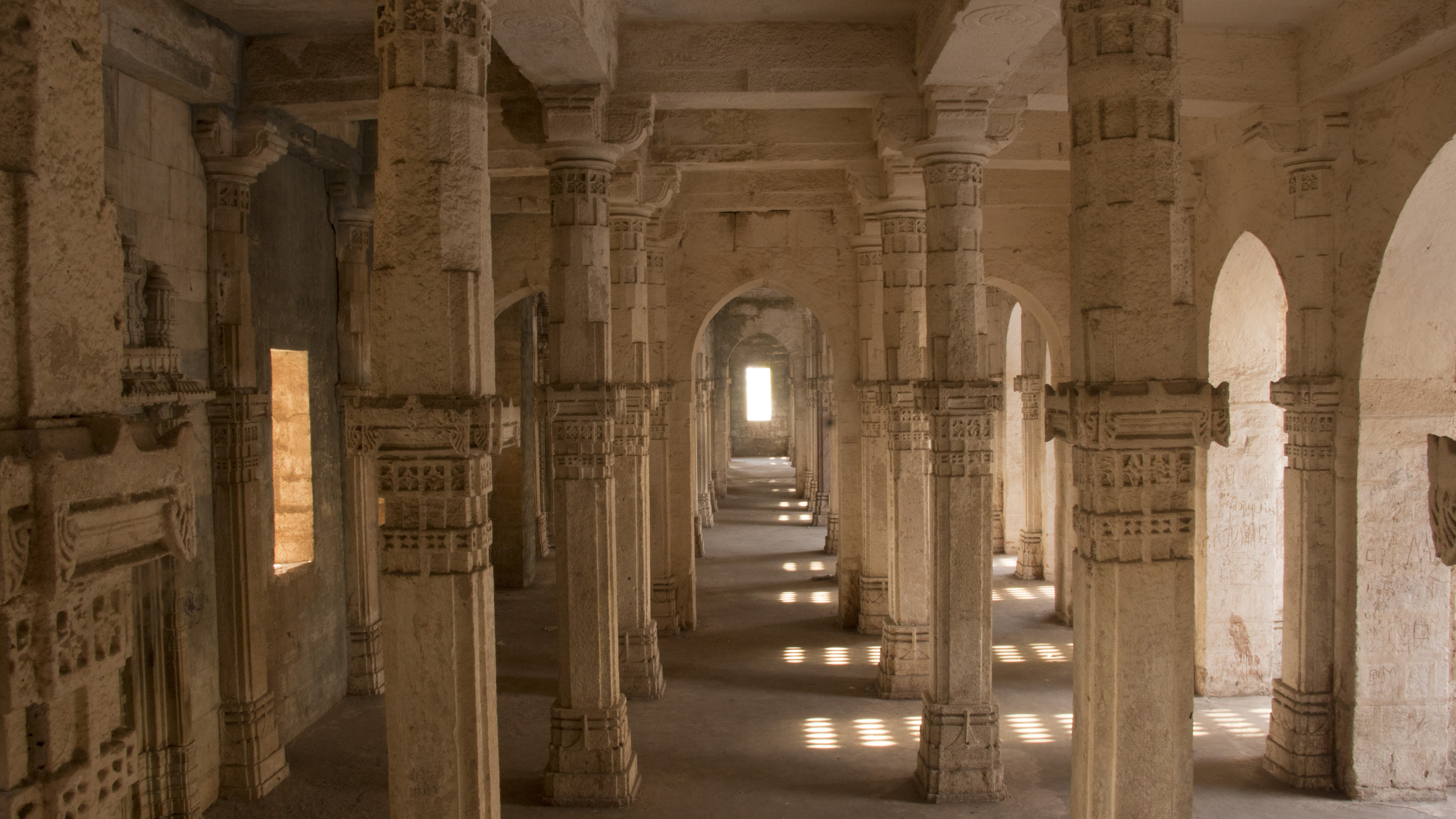
Interior of the mosque

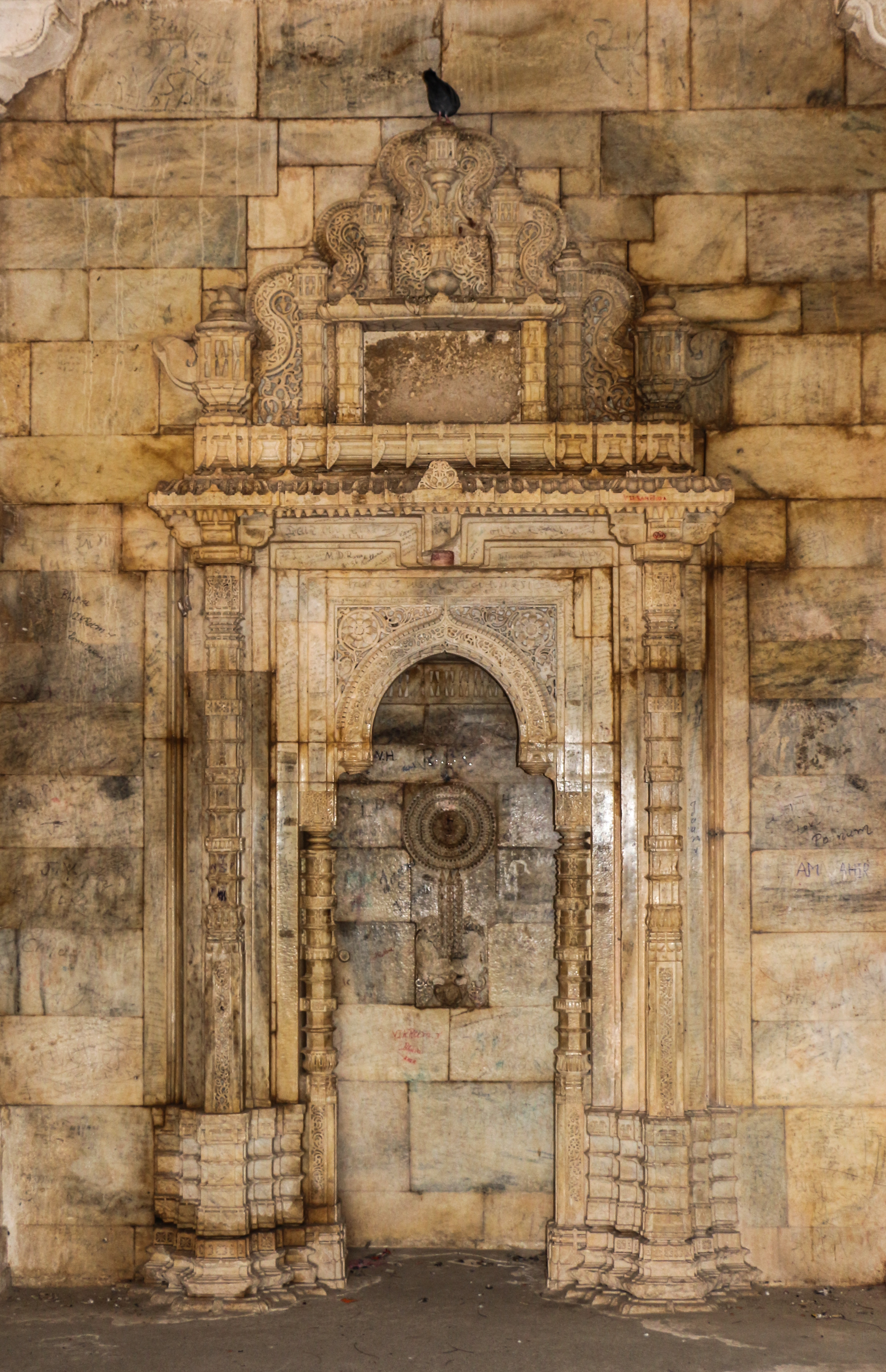
Mihrab inside the mosque

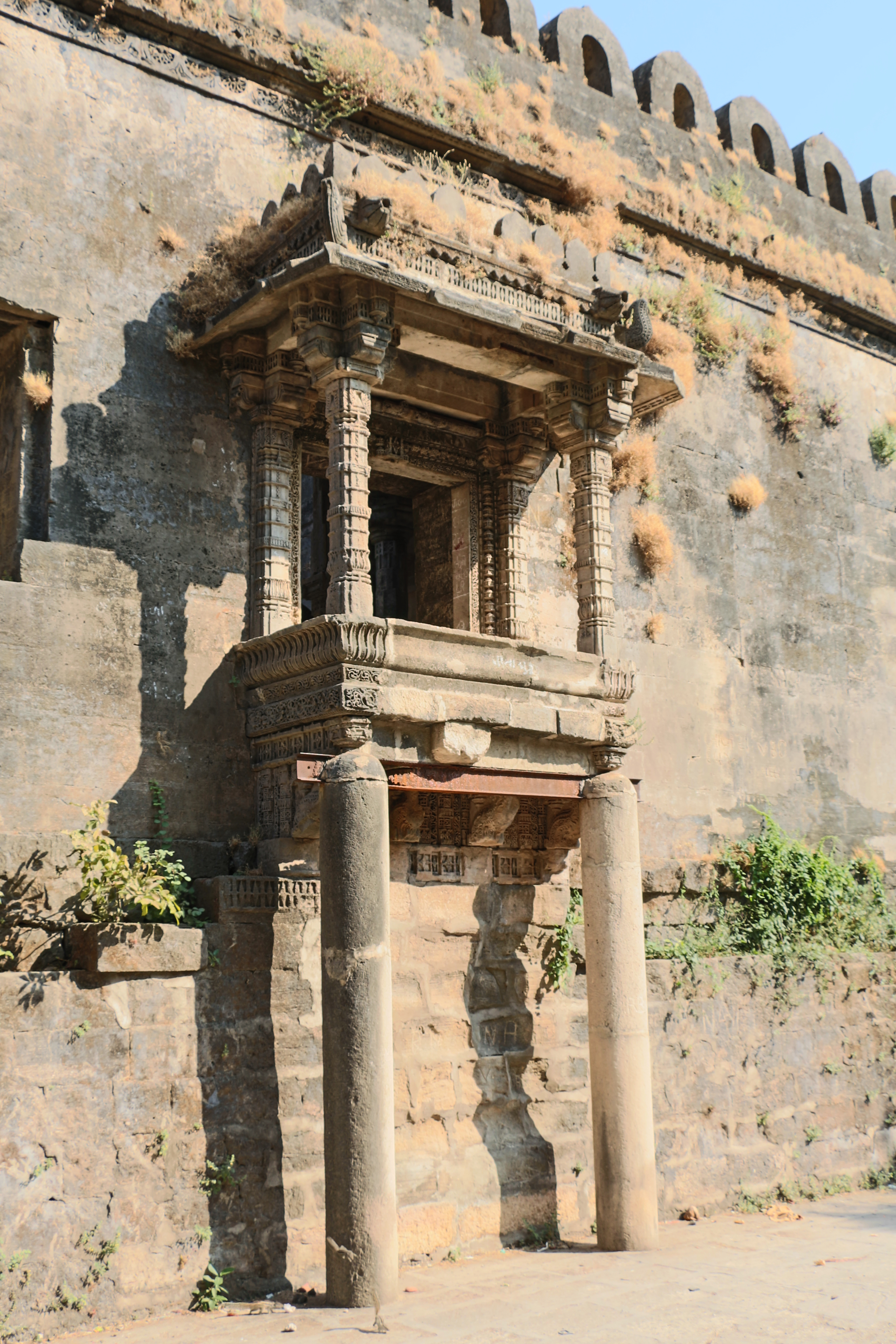
Balcony

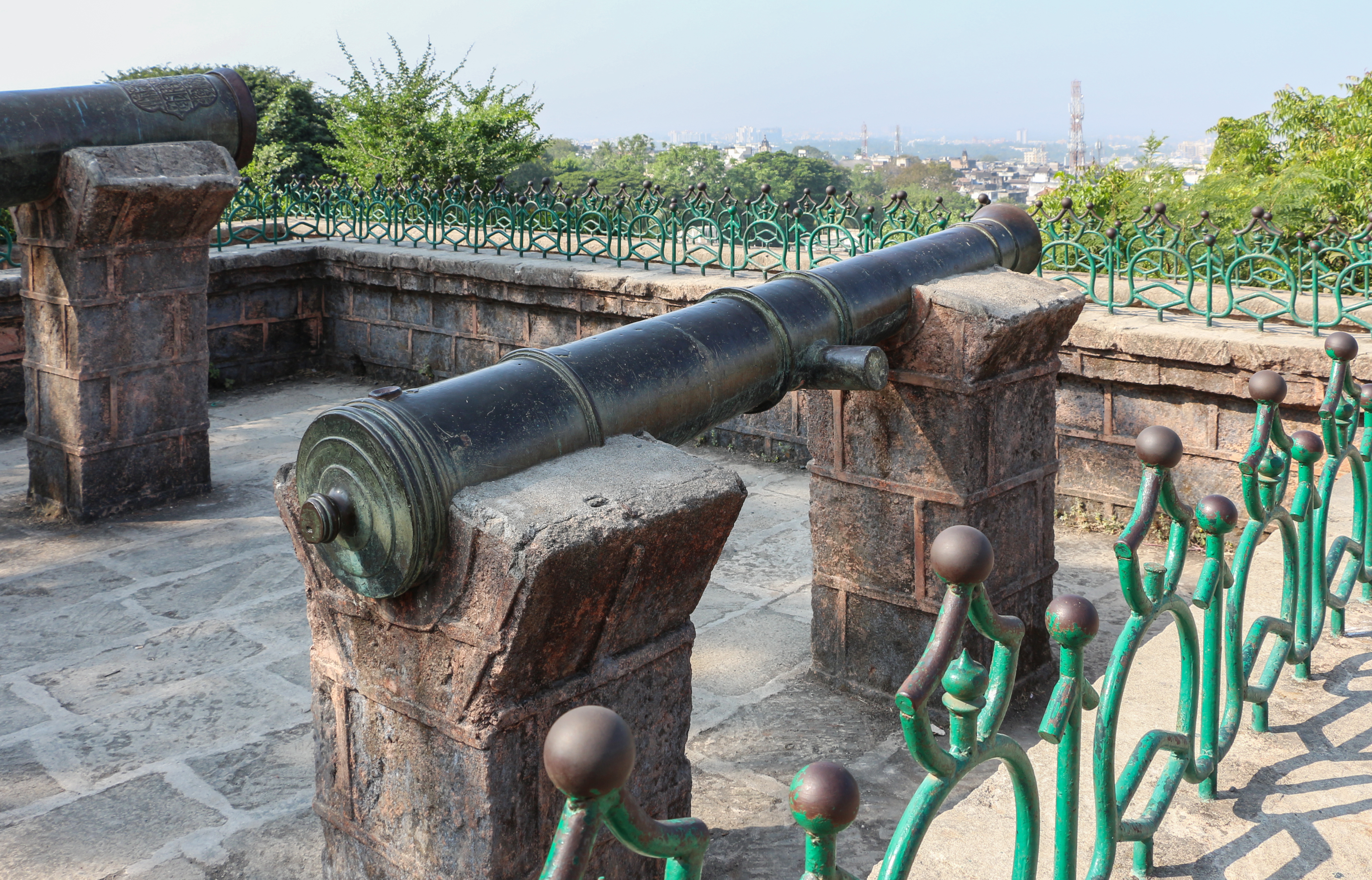
Cannons

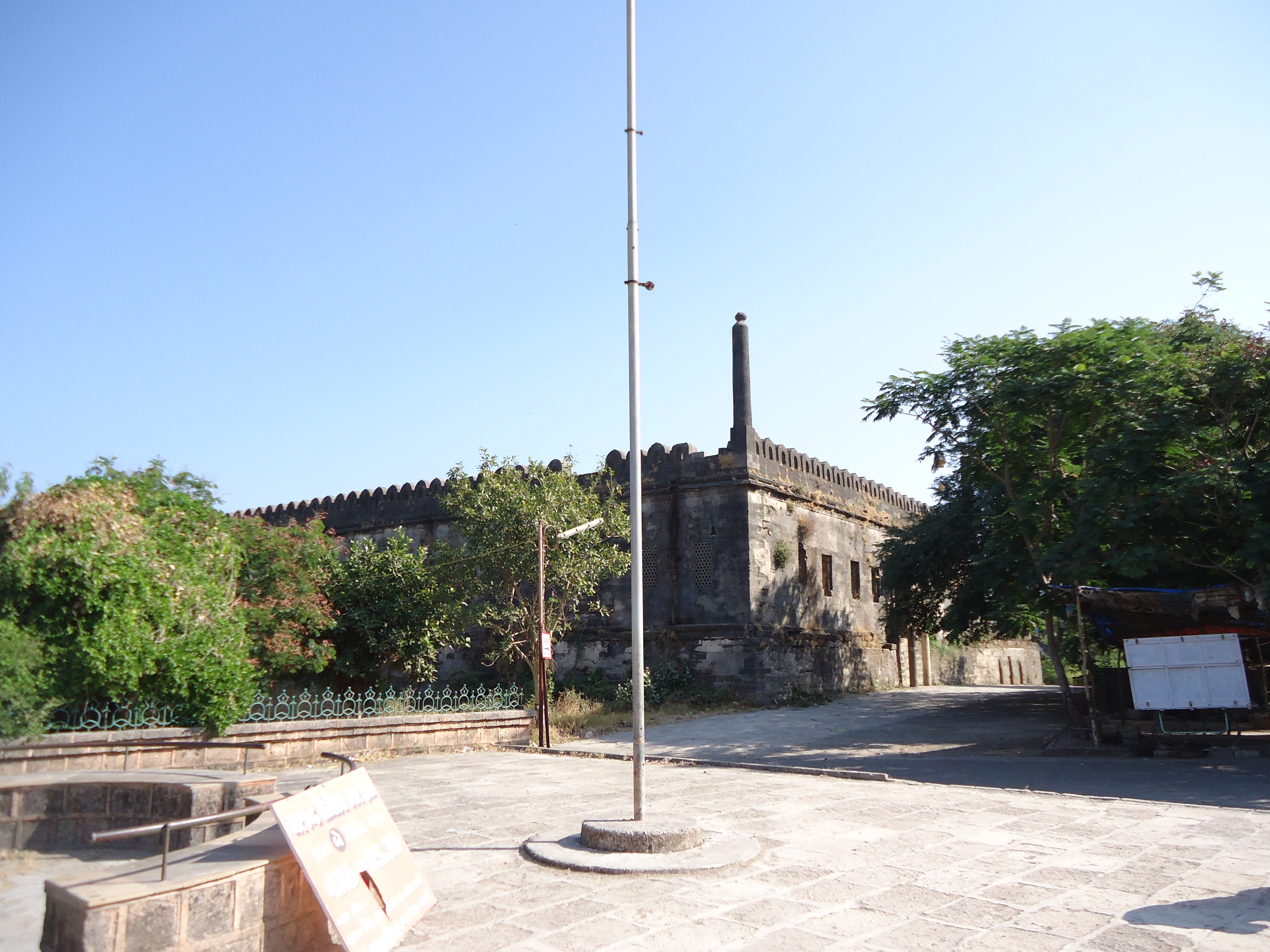
From distance

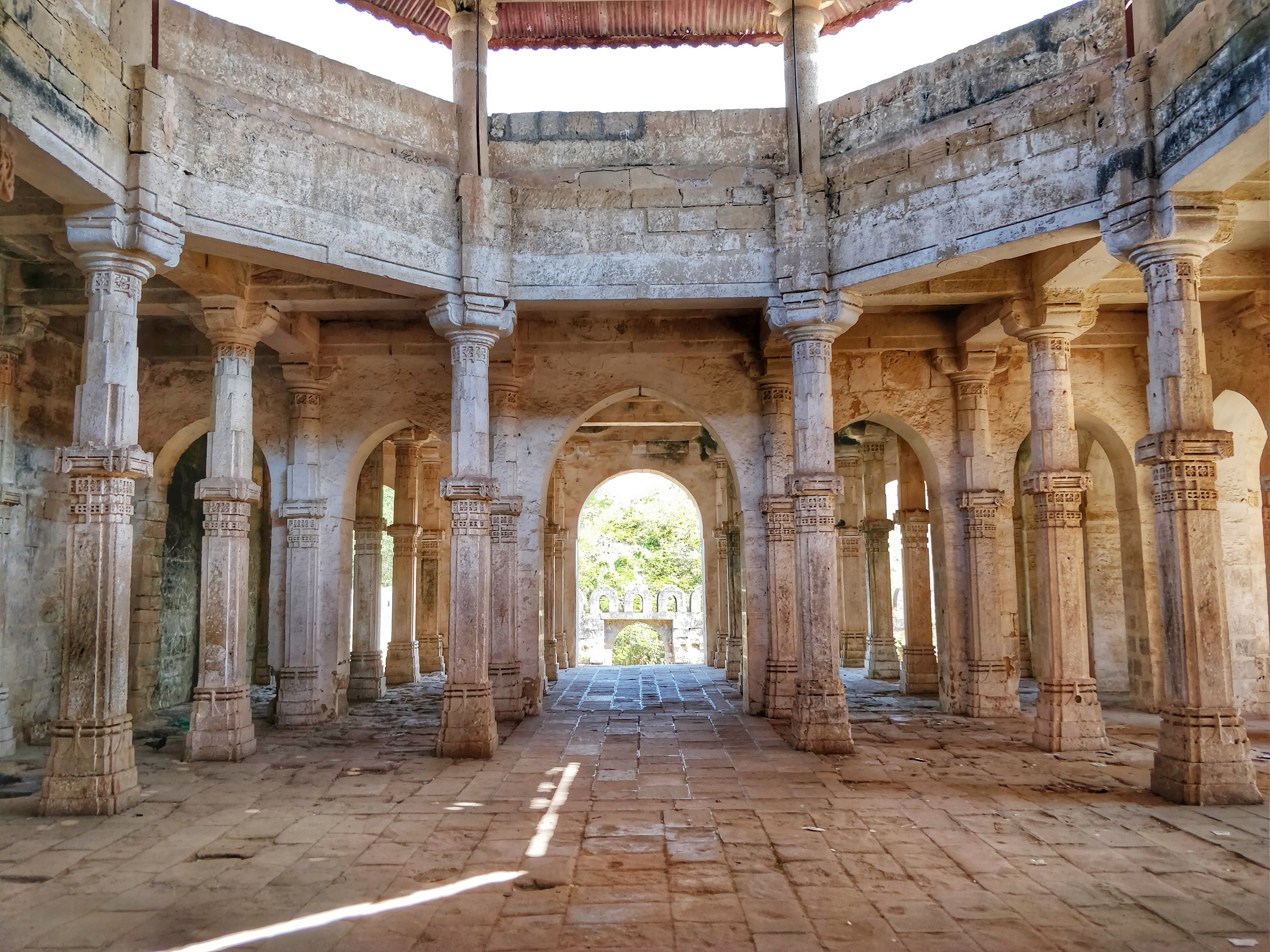
Hall with temporary roof

== See also ==
- Islam in India
- List of mosques in India
- List of State Protected Monuments in Gujarat
- Uparkot Fort
- Uparkot Caves
