= Uparkot Fort =

Fort in Junagadh, Gujarat, India

- Junagadh, Gujarat, India
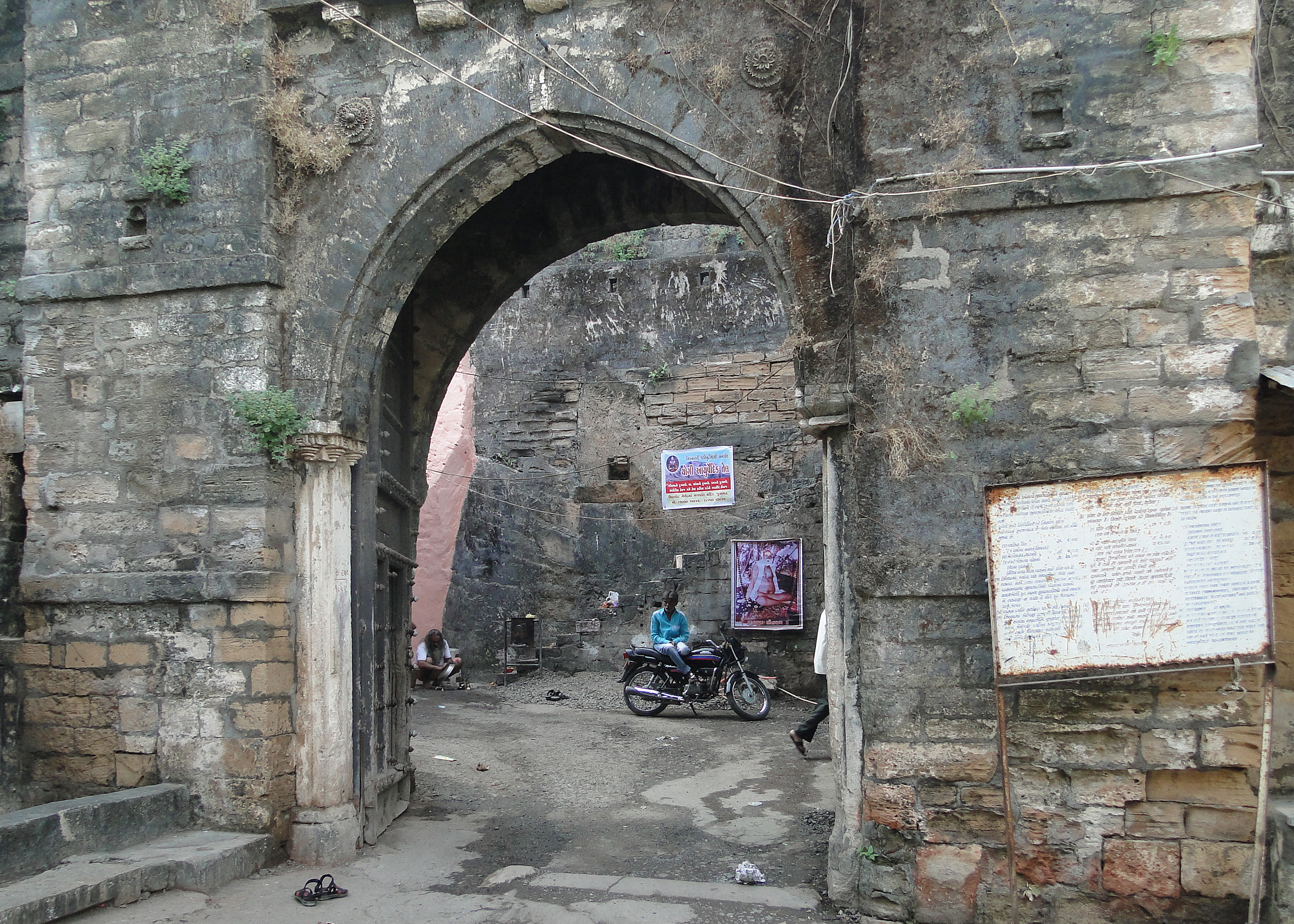
- Uparkot fort rediscovered and rebuilt during reign of Chudasama ruler Graharipu

Site information
- Type: Fort
- Controlled by: Government of Gujarat
- Open to the public: Yes
- Condition: Ruins

Location
- Coordinates: 21.5236831°N 70.4695183°E

Site history
- Built by: Graharipu of Chudasama dynasty
- Materials: Granite Stones and lime mortar

Uparkot is a fort located in east side of Junagadh, Gujarat, India.

== History ==
A fort and town was established at the foothills of Girnar hill during reign of the Maurya Empire and continued to be used during Gupta period, but it lost its importance when the capital of Saurashtra region was moved from Junagadh to Vallabhi by Maitraka. Chudasamas settled around Junagadh from 875 CE according to bards when they acquired Vamansthali (Vanthli) from Chavda ruler.

A 10th-century Chudasama king Abhira Graharipu (r. c.940-c.982) cleared the old citadel free from the jungle. From the evidence contained in the Hemchandra's Dvyashraya, it can be concluded that Graharipu laid the foundations of the citadel as it now exists. The legend is told about its rediscovery.

=== Legend ===
After several Ahirs of Vamansthali had ruled, a woodcutter one day managed to cut his way through the forest and came to a place where stone walls and a gate existed. Nearby sat a holy man in contemplation, and on being asked by the woodcutter the name of the place and its history, he replied that its name was "Juna" — old. The woodcutter returned by the way he had come to Vamansthali, and reported his discovery to the Chudasama ruler, who ordered the forest to be cleared away. This being done, the fort came into sight. But there was none who knew its history, or who could tell more than the holy man had told the woodcutter. So the place became known as "Junagadh" for want of a better title.

If this story is to be believed, either AbhiraGraharipu rediscovered an ancient stronghold or else after he had built the fort, it was abandoned and afterwards found again by a later ruler Navaghana who transferred Chudasama capital from Vamansthali to Junagadh.

=== Restorations ===
In 1893-94, Haridas Viharidas, the Dewan of Junagadh State, had restored the fort.

In July 2020, the Government of Gujarat initiated the restoration of the fort and the structures inside it at the cost of ₹44.46 crore (US$4.7 million). The project will be completed in 18 months.

== Architecture and places of interest ==
The Uparkot is one of the most interesting of old forts. The parapets on the east, where the place is commanded by higher ground, have been raised at least three times to give cover against the increasingly long range of projectiles.

The entrance is beyond the town in the east wall, and consists of three gateways, one inside the other. The fort walls are from 60 to 70 feet high, forming a massive cluster of buildings. The inner gateway, a beautiful specimen of the Torana, has been topped by more later Indo-Saracenic work.

On the rampart above the gate is an inscription of Mandalika III, dated 1450. Near this is the Jumma Masjid built by Mahmud Begada.

The Tomb of Nuri Shah, close to the mosque, is ornamented with fluted cupolas, and a most peculiar carving over the door. There are two Wells in the Uparkot — the Adi Kadi Vav, said to have been built in ancient times by the maids of the Chudasama rulers, is descended by a long flight of steps; and the Navghan Kuvo, cut to a great depth in the soft rock, and with a circular staircase.

Uparkot Caves are 2nd-3rd century Buddhist caves located in the Uparkot. It is double storeyed cave complex used by Buddhist monks during ancient times.

Nawabi Lake is a square artificial lake located in the Uparkot.

== Gallery ==
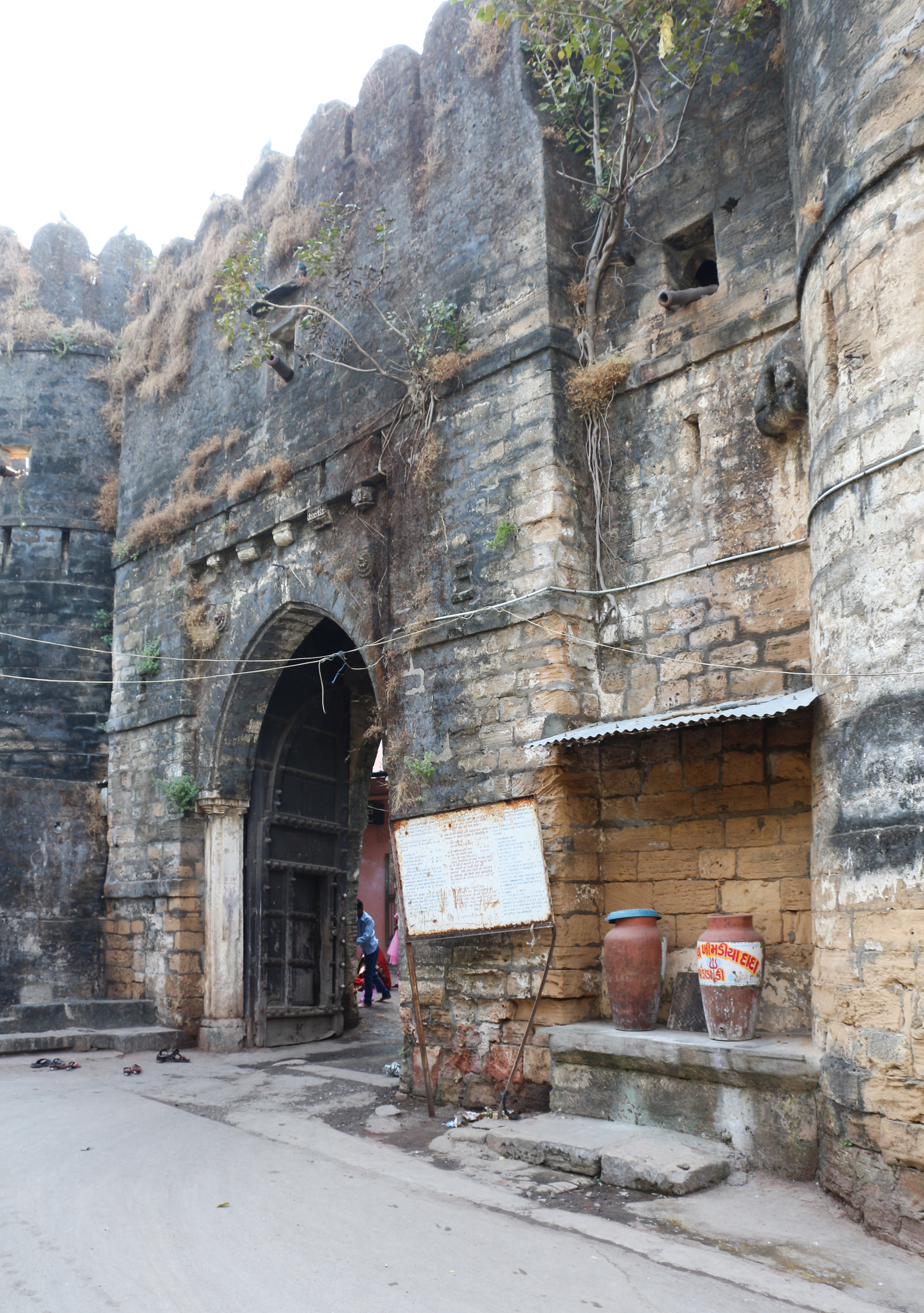
Gate

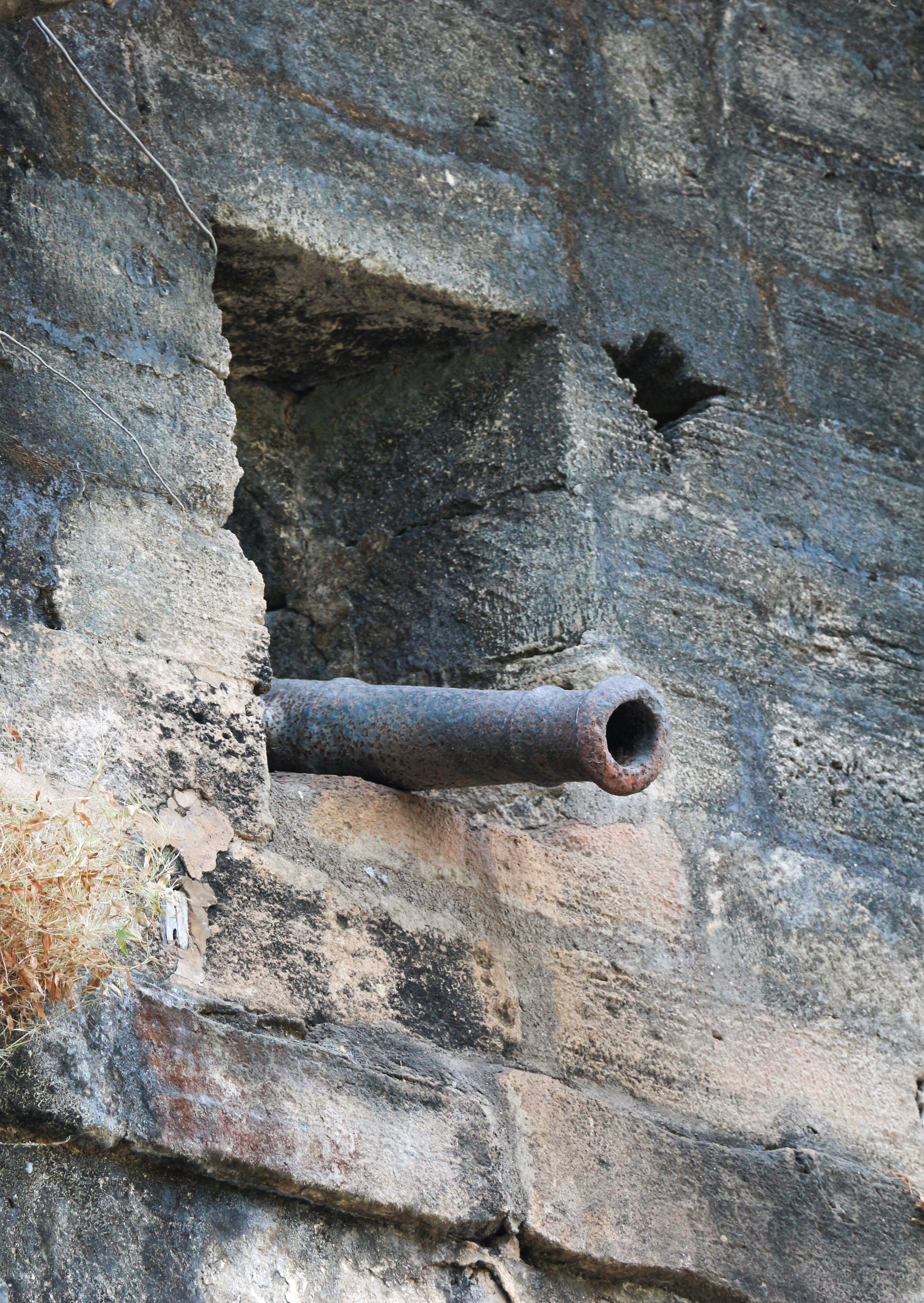
Cannon

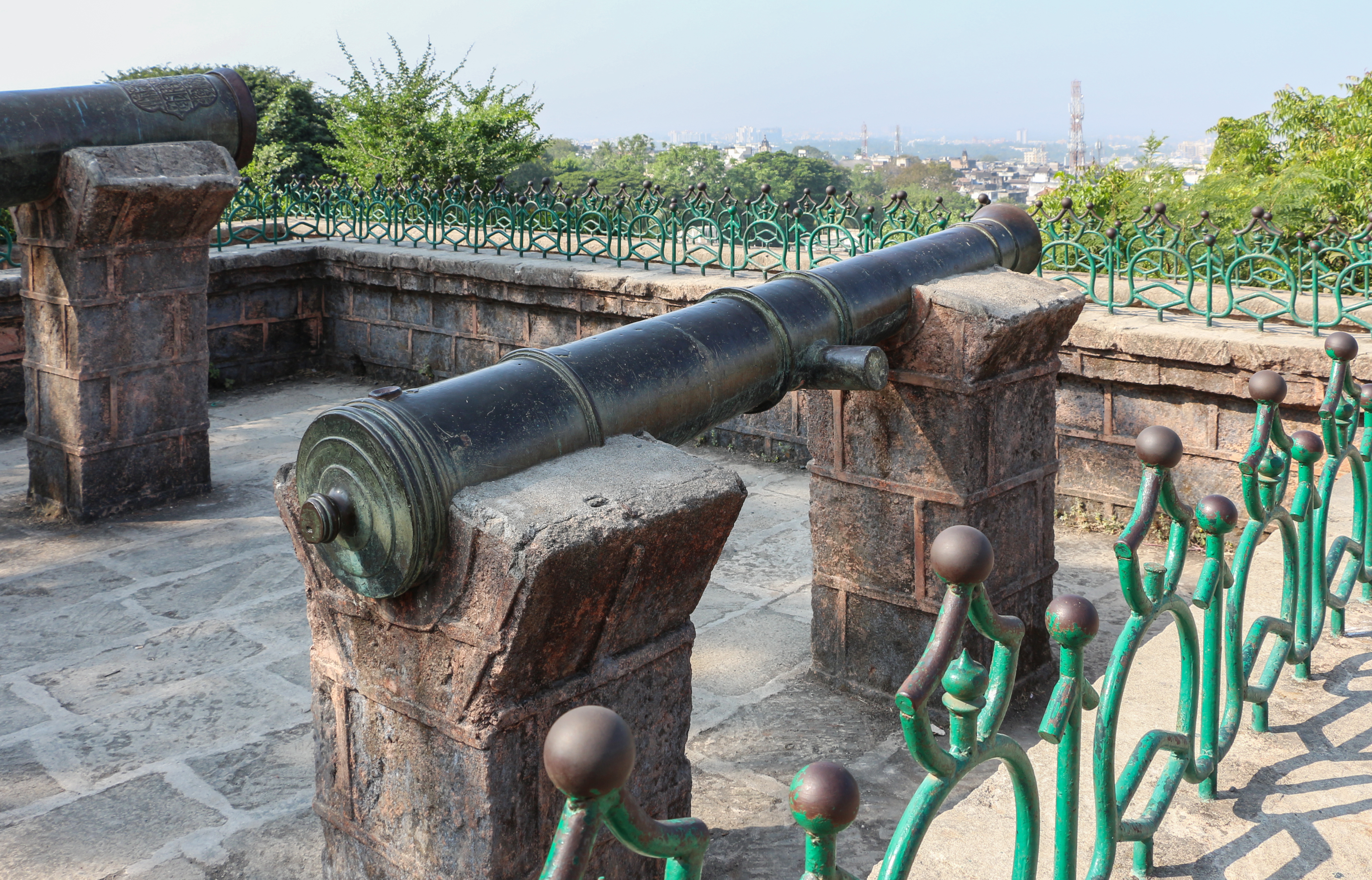
Cannons named Neelam and Manek

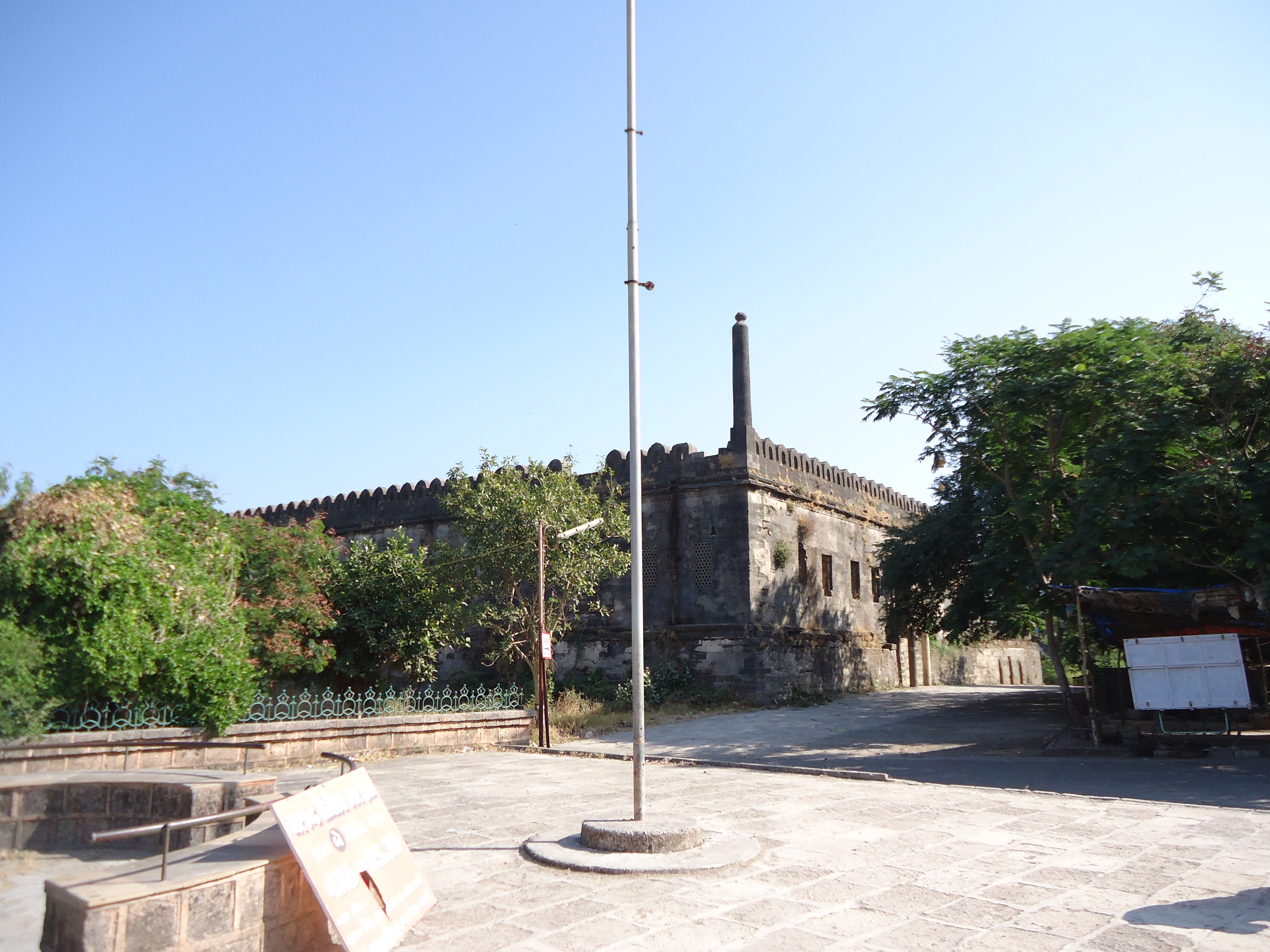
Jama Mosque (formerly a palace)

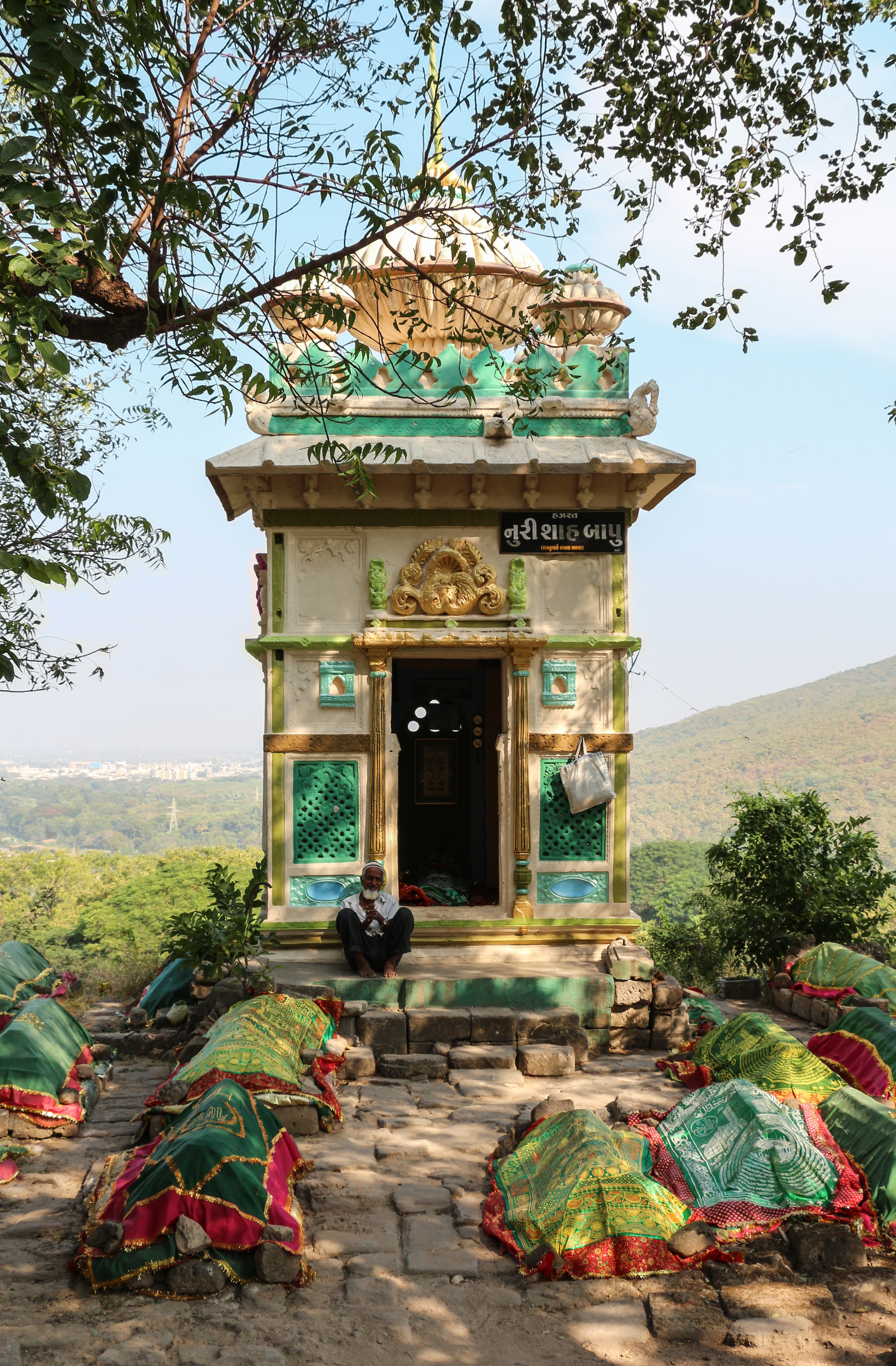
Tomb of Nuri Shah

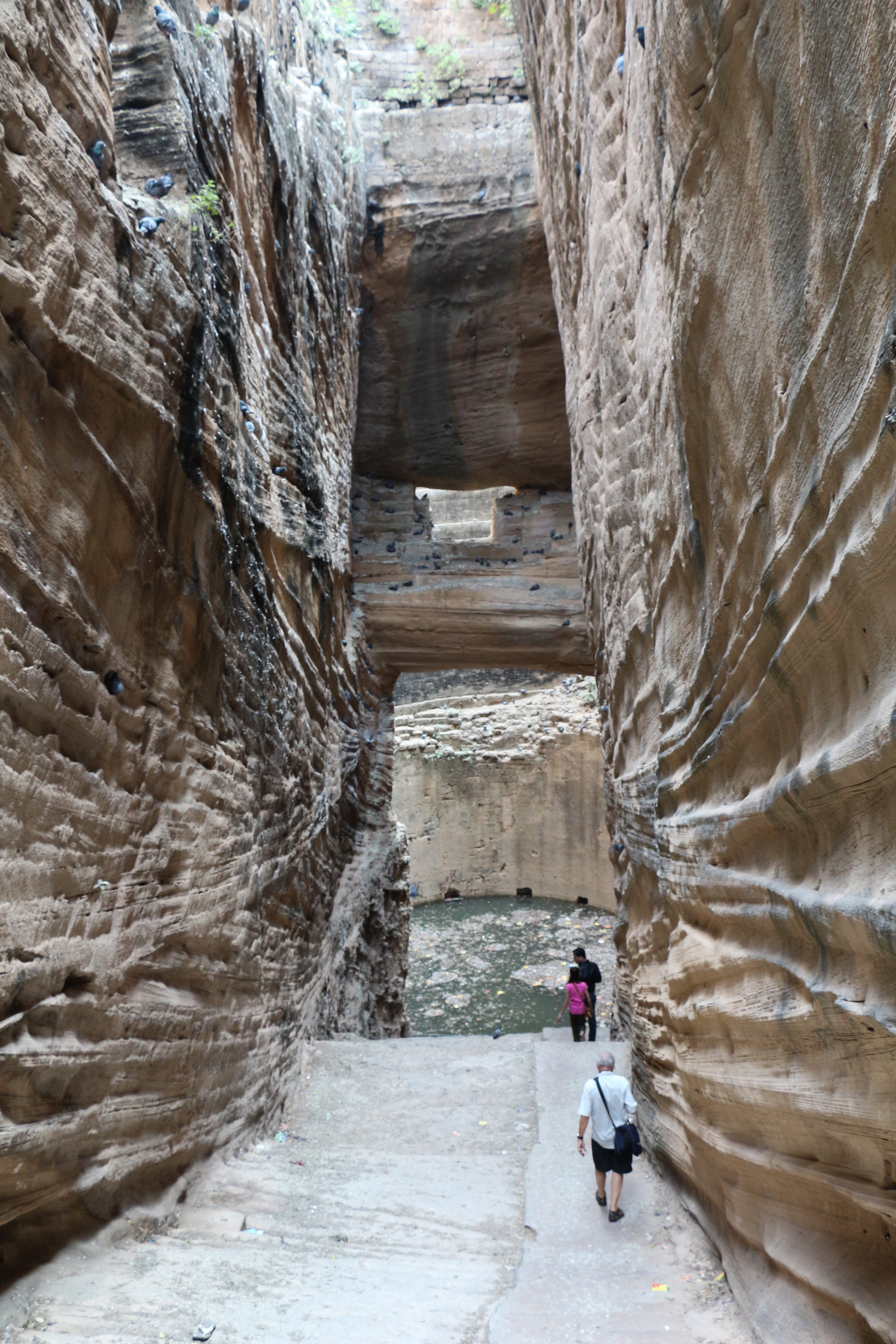
Adi Kadi Vav

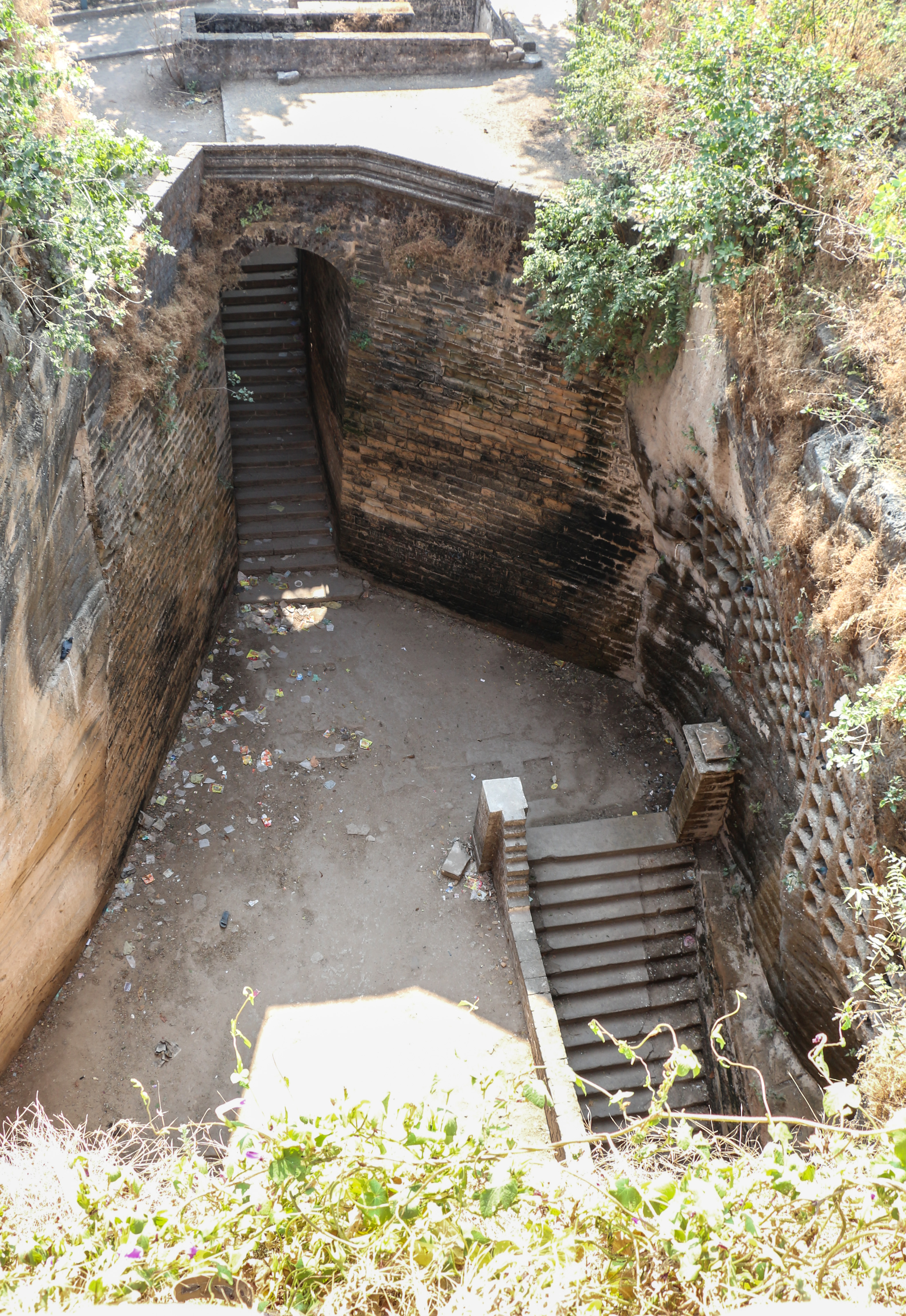
Navghan Kuvo

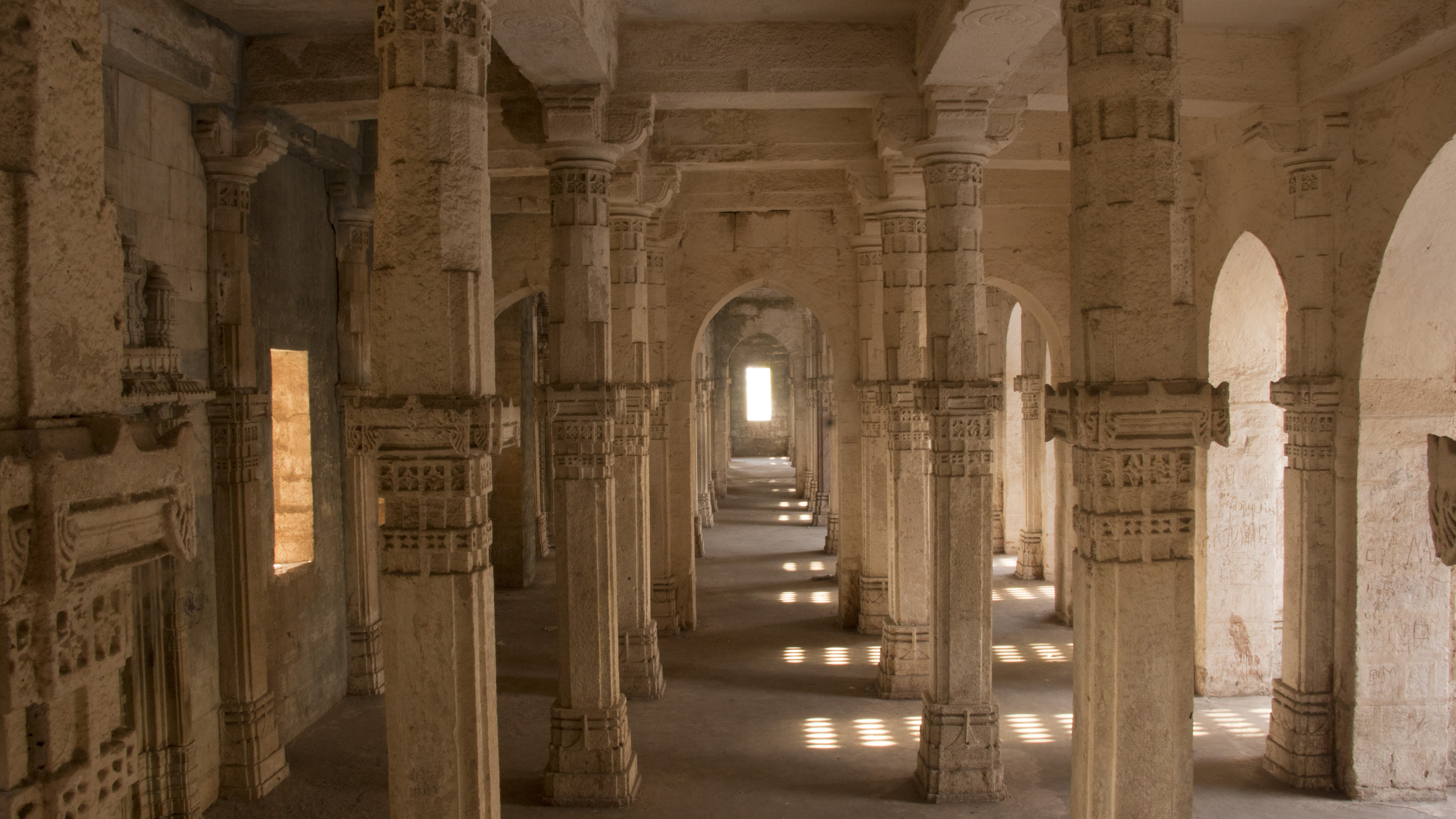
Mosque

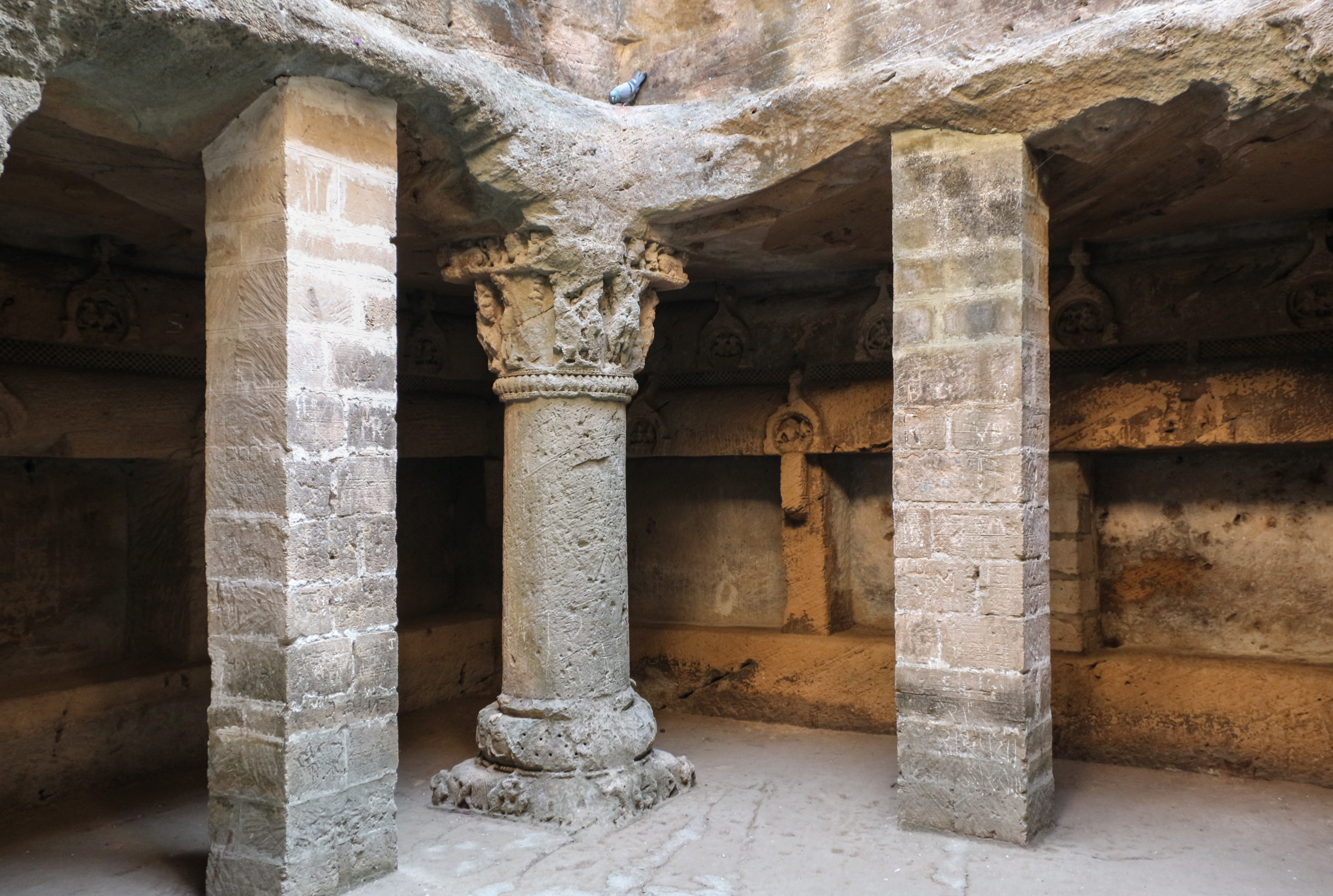
Buddhist Caves

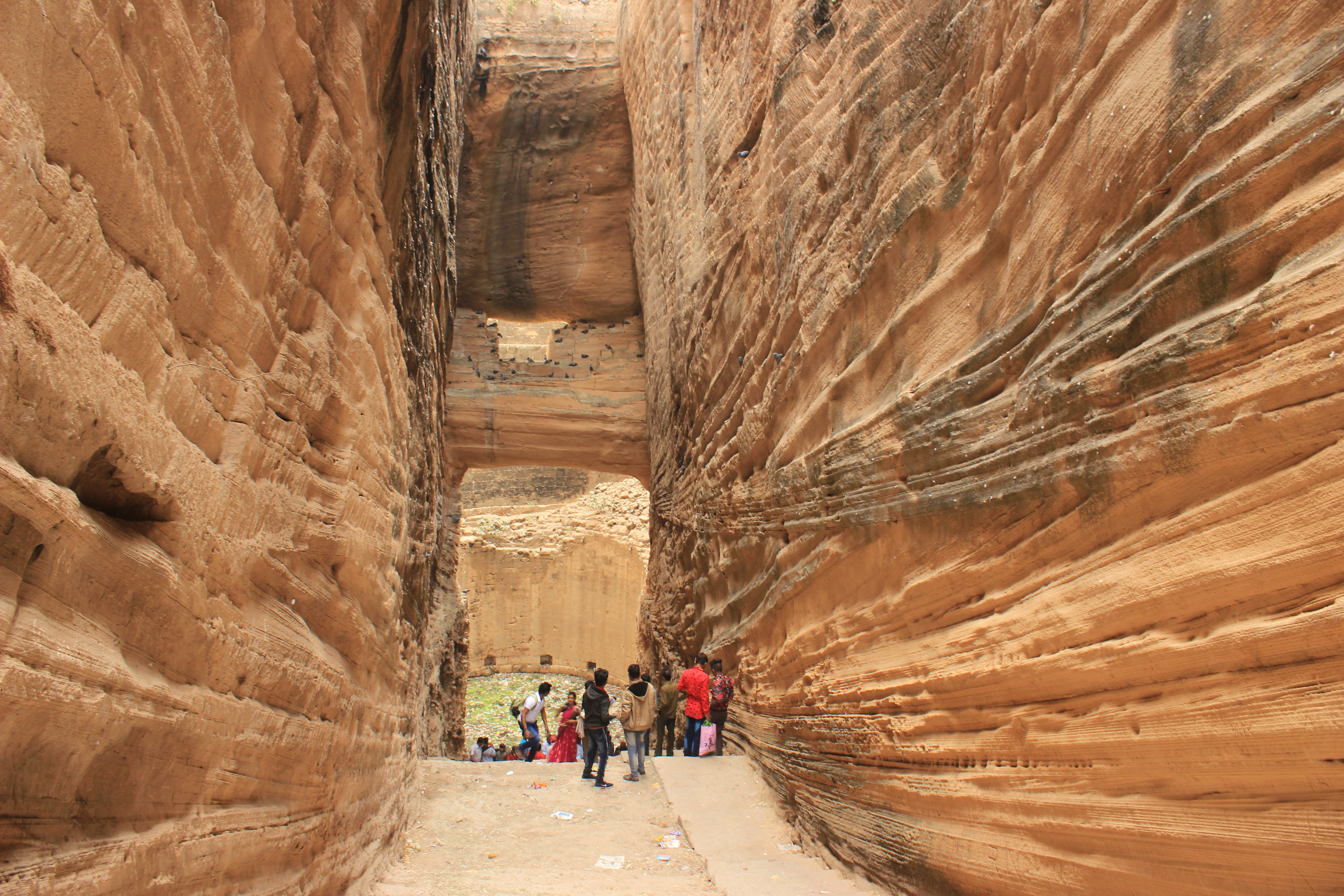
Adi Kadi Vav, Junagadh, Gujarat

== See also ==
- Jumma Masjid, Uparkot
- Uparkot Caves
