= Adi Kadi Vav =

Stepwell in Junagadh, Gujarat, India

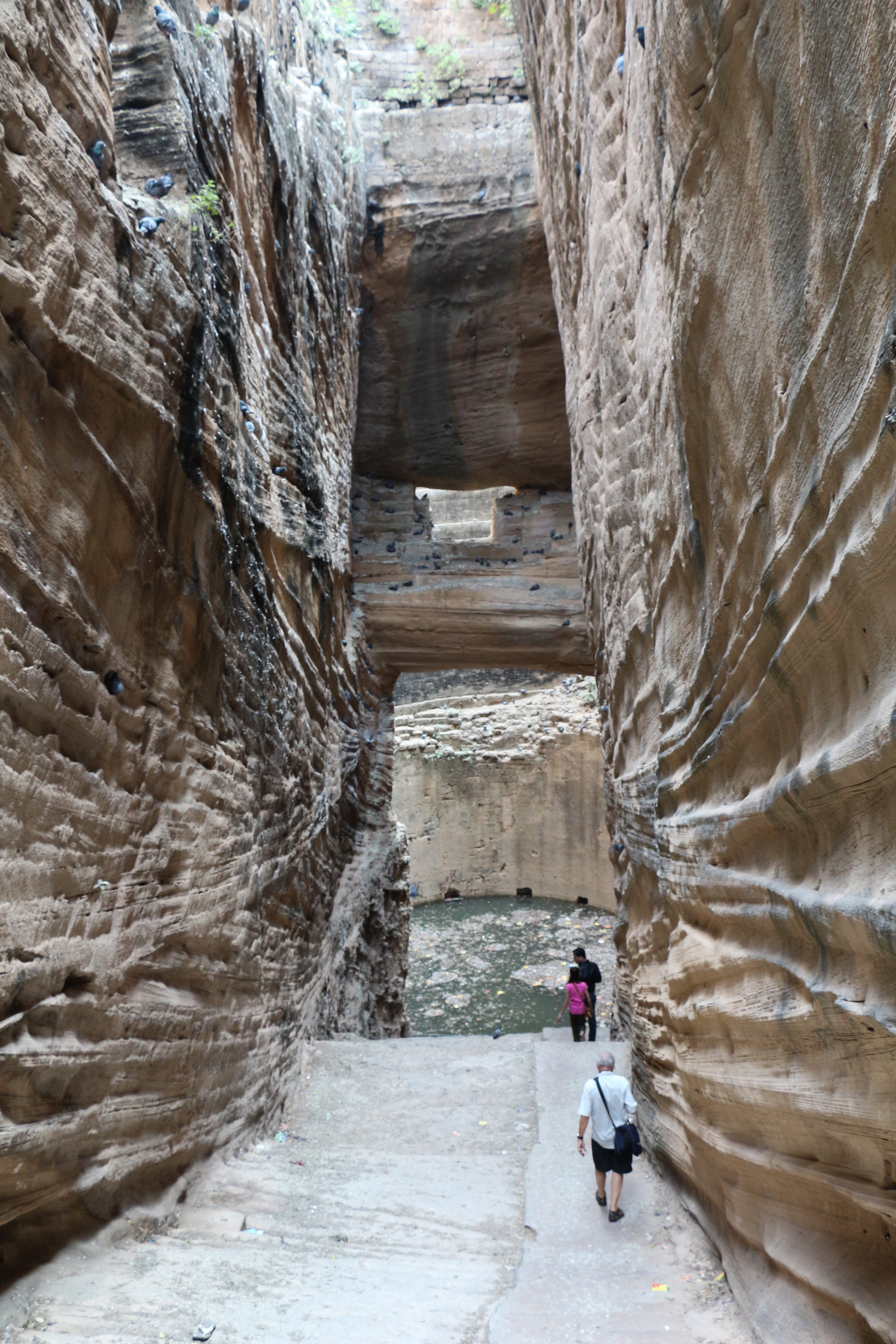
- Flight of steps leading to the well
- Interactive map of the Adi Kadi Vav area

General information
- Type: Stepwell
- Architectural style: Indian architecture
- Location: Uparkot Fort, Junagadh, India
- Coordinates: 21.526628°N 70.471289°E
- Completed: uncertain

Design and construction
- Architect: Local
- Designations: ASI State Protected Monument No. S-GJ-114

Adi Kadi Vav or Adi Chadi Vav is a stepwell in Uparkot Fort, Junagadh, Gujarat, India. The date of its construction is uncertain.

== History ==
According to Junagadh district administration website, the stepwell was constructed in 15th century. Other sources says that it was constructed in second half of the 10th century or in 11th century during the rule of Chudasama dynasty. Another source says that it was constructed in 319 BCE and rediscovered in 976 CE.

According to local historian Parimal Rupani, there were two separate stepwells. It is the Adi stepwell and the Kadi stepwell is still buried, according to him.

It is a state protected monument (S-GJ-114).

== Architecture ==
Adi Kadi Vav is a Nanda type of stepwell. It is not built but carved out of solid natural rock. There is a flight of 166 steps in a narrow corridor to reach well shaft. A small window is carved in the thin rock layer above the well. The rock strata is visible in the eroded walls. The well is 123 feet deep. There is no ornamentations, shafts or pillars as in other stepwells.

== Popular culture ==
According to a legend about its name, when the stepwell was constructed, no water was found. But on instruction of the royal priest, two unmarried girls named Adi and Kadi were sacrificed and the water was found. Another legend tells that Adi and Kadi were the royal maids who fetched water from the stepwell every day. People hangs cloths and bangles on the tree nearby to commemorate them.

There is a proverb in Gujarati: Adi Kadi ni Vav Ane Navghan Kuvo, Je Na Juve Te Jivto Muo (One who have not seen Adi Kadi Vav and Navghan Kuvo, is like living dead).

== Gallery ==
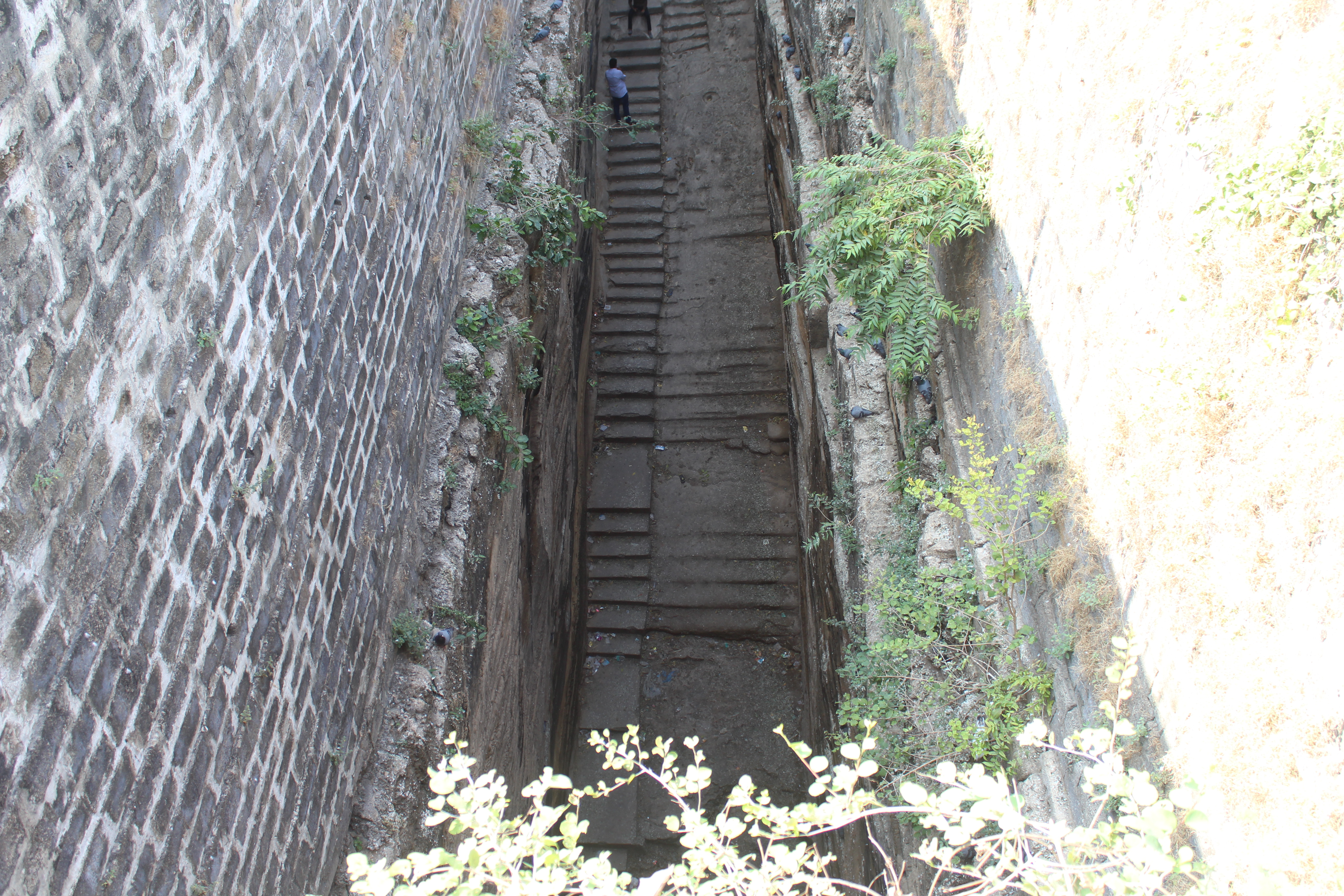
Steps leading to well

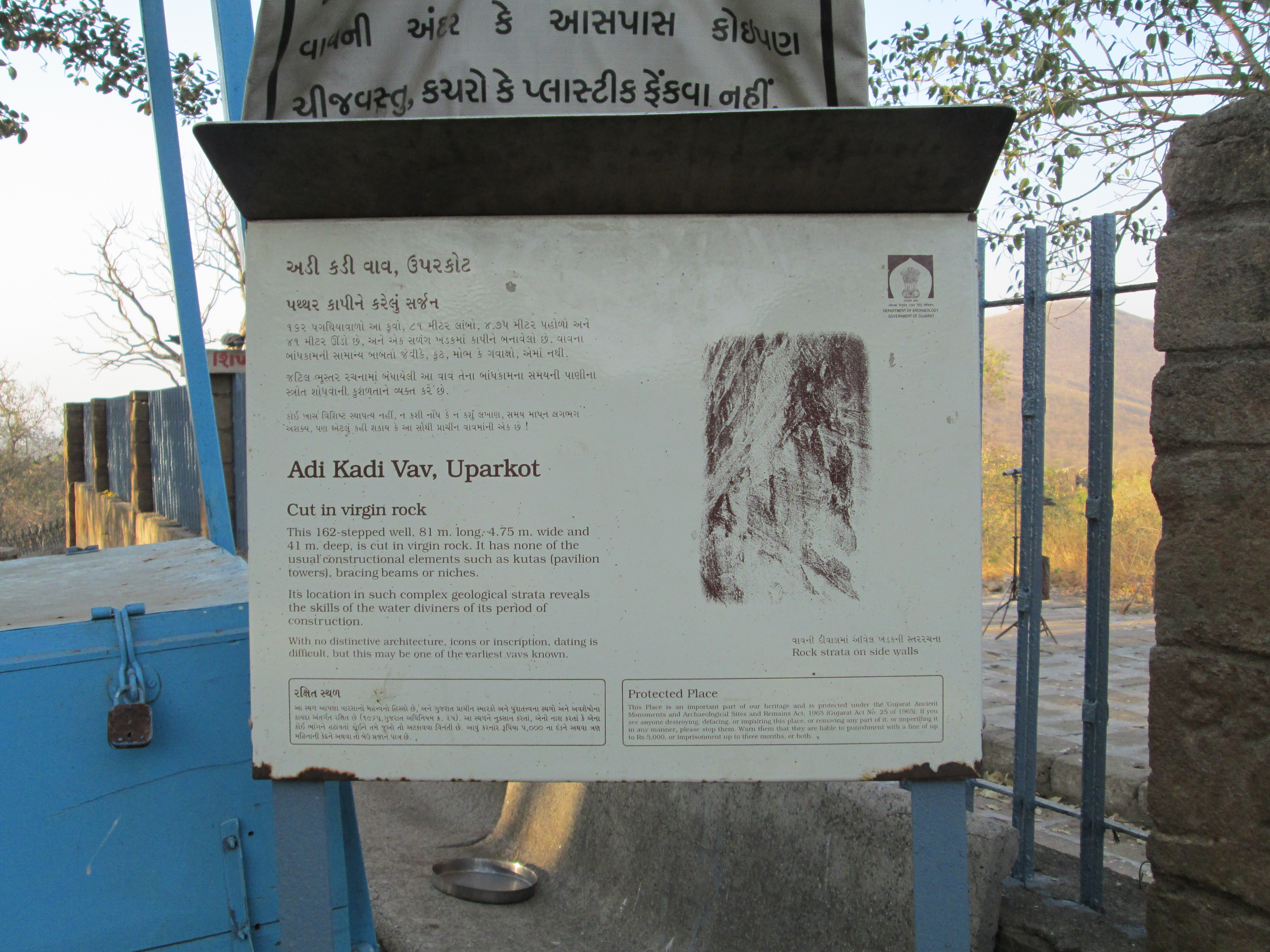
Information board

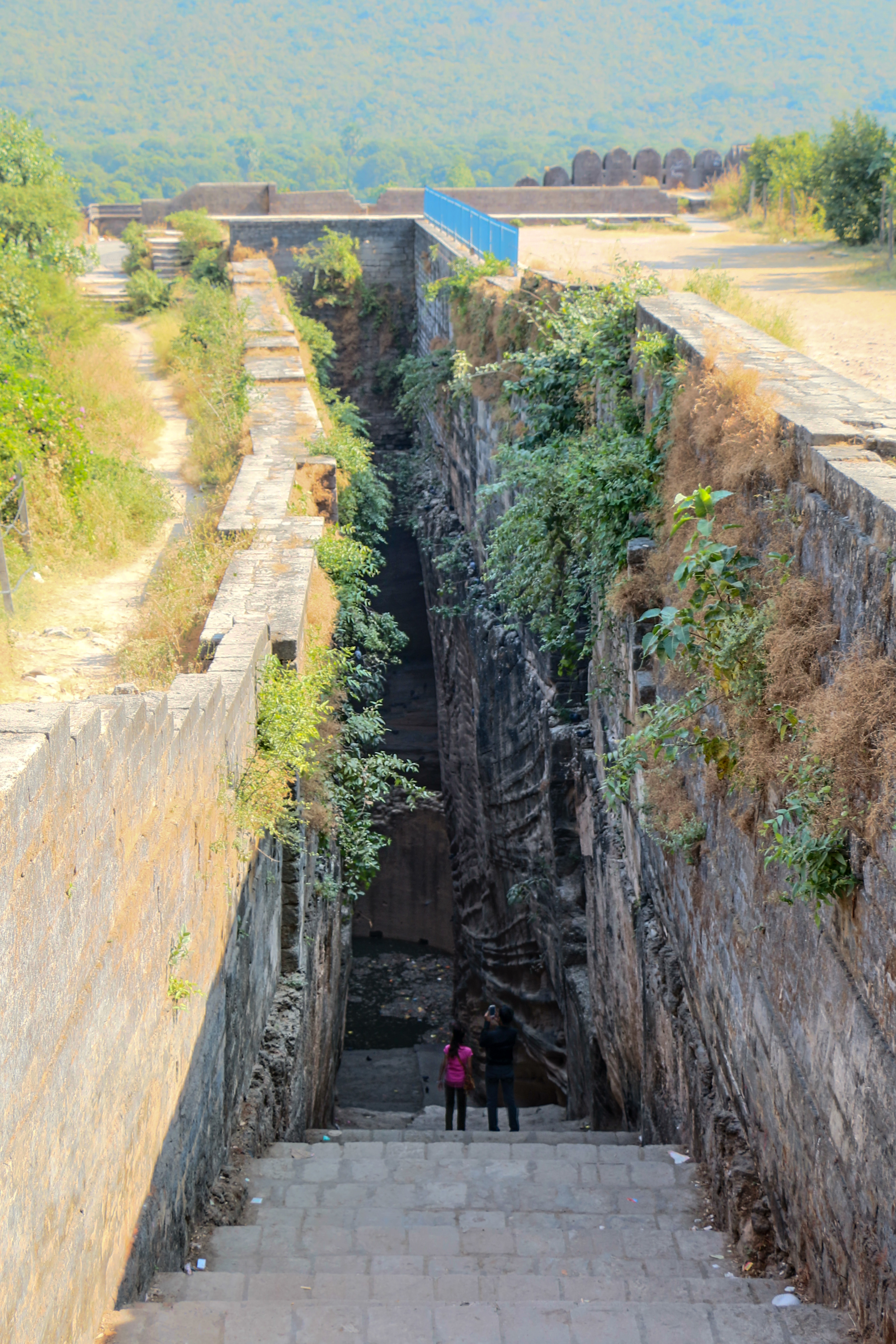
From outside

== See also ==
- Navghan Kuvo
- Stepwell
- Rani ki vav
- History of stepwells in Gujarat
