= Uparkot Caves =

Buddhist caves in Gujarat, India

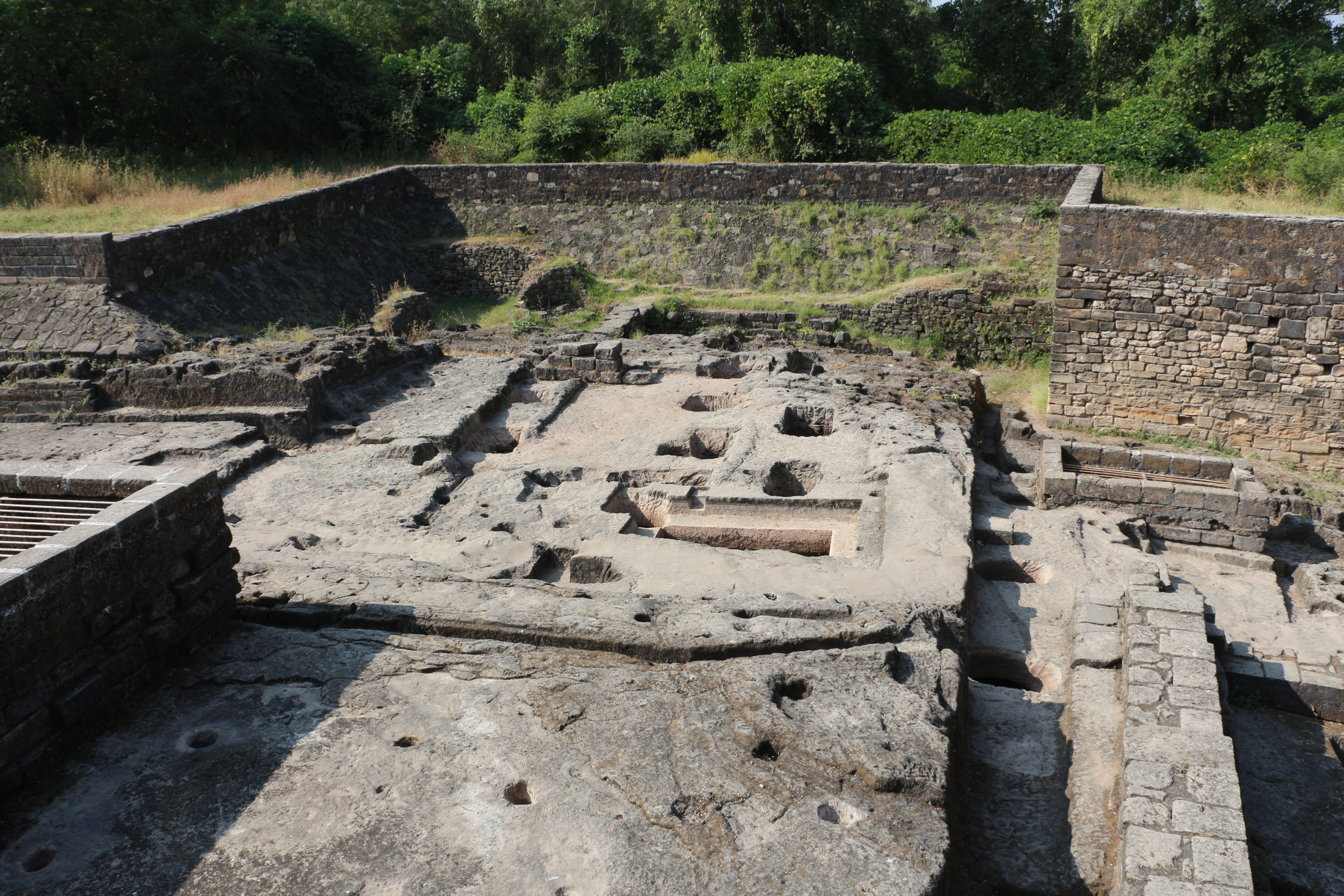
- Upper floor of the Uperkot caves

- Location within India Location within Gujarat
- Coordinates: 21.5257426°N 70.4692992°E

Uparkot caves, also Uperkot caves, are ancient man-made caverns. The caves are a part of the Junagadh Buddhist Cave Groups situated in the eastern part of Junagadh of the Indian state of Gujarat.

== Caves ==
These caves located at Uperkot beyond the 300 ft deep moat, close to Adi Kadi Vav, were carved in 2nd–3rd century A.D. These caves have influence of Satavahana architecture with combination of Graeco-Scythian style.

According to ASI "The cave group is in three tiers, with all members of each galleries shown in semi-relief, but only two storeys having regular floors. The caves at Uparkot are cut into two floors. On the first floor, there is a Kunda, a deep tank about 11 feet square, with a covered verandah round three sides of it. There is a big chamber with six pillars supporting the roof adjoining it. Under the corridor, in the rest of the area, in the walls on the north-east and west sides are stone bench-recesses, divided into long compartments with a base moulded in architectural courses below, and a frieze above, ornamented with horseshoe shaped chaitya windows and checker carvings. On the lower floor, there are similar rooms, having a corridor, pillars supporting the floor above, stone bench-recesses and above them, the chaitya-window ornament.

The lower floor has intricately carved pillars whose base, shaft and capital carry decorative design. The caves have pillars and entrances, water cisterns, horseshoe shaped chaitya windows, an assembly hall and cell for meditation.

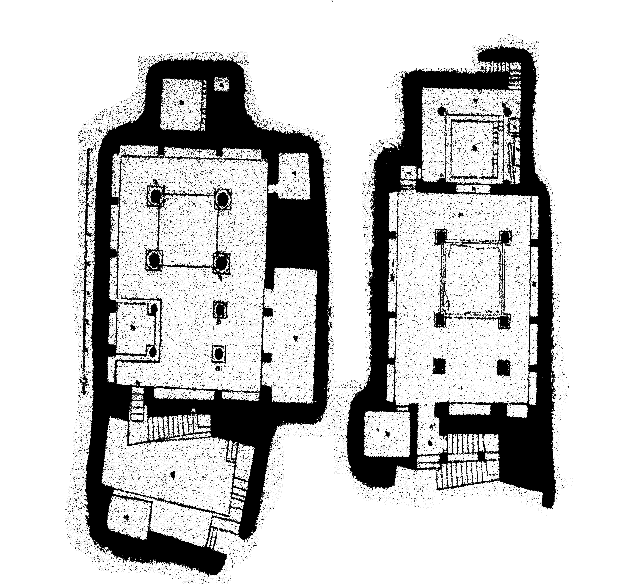
Plan of Uparkot caves; lower floor (left) and upper floor (right)

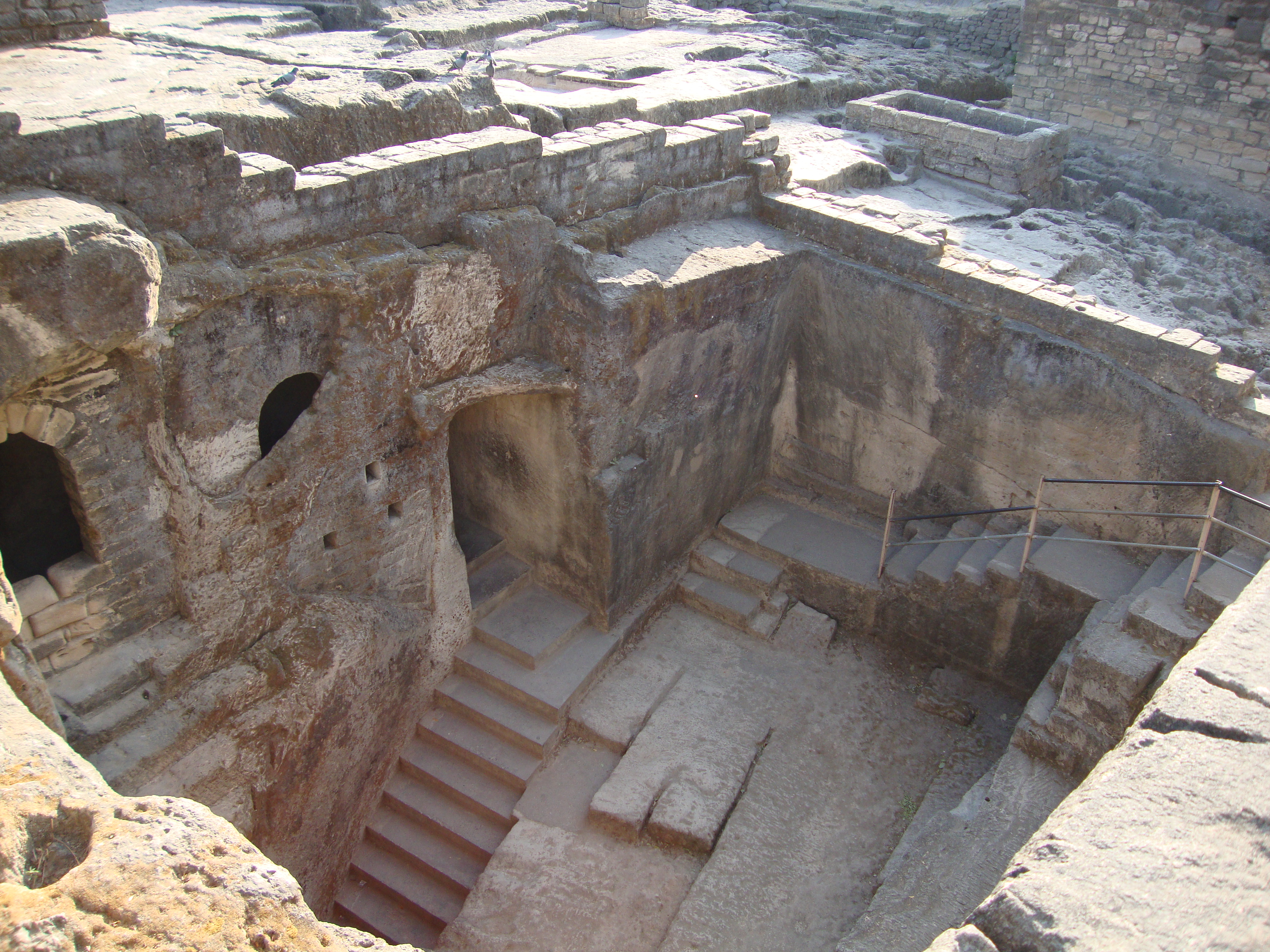
View from the top.

Internal room.

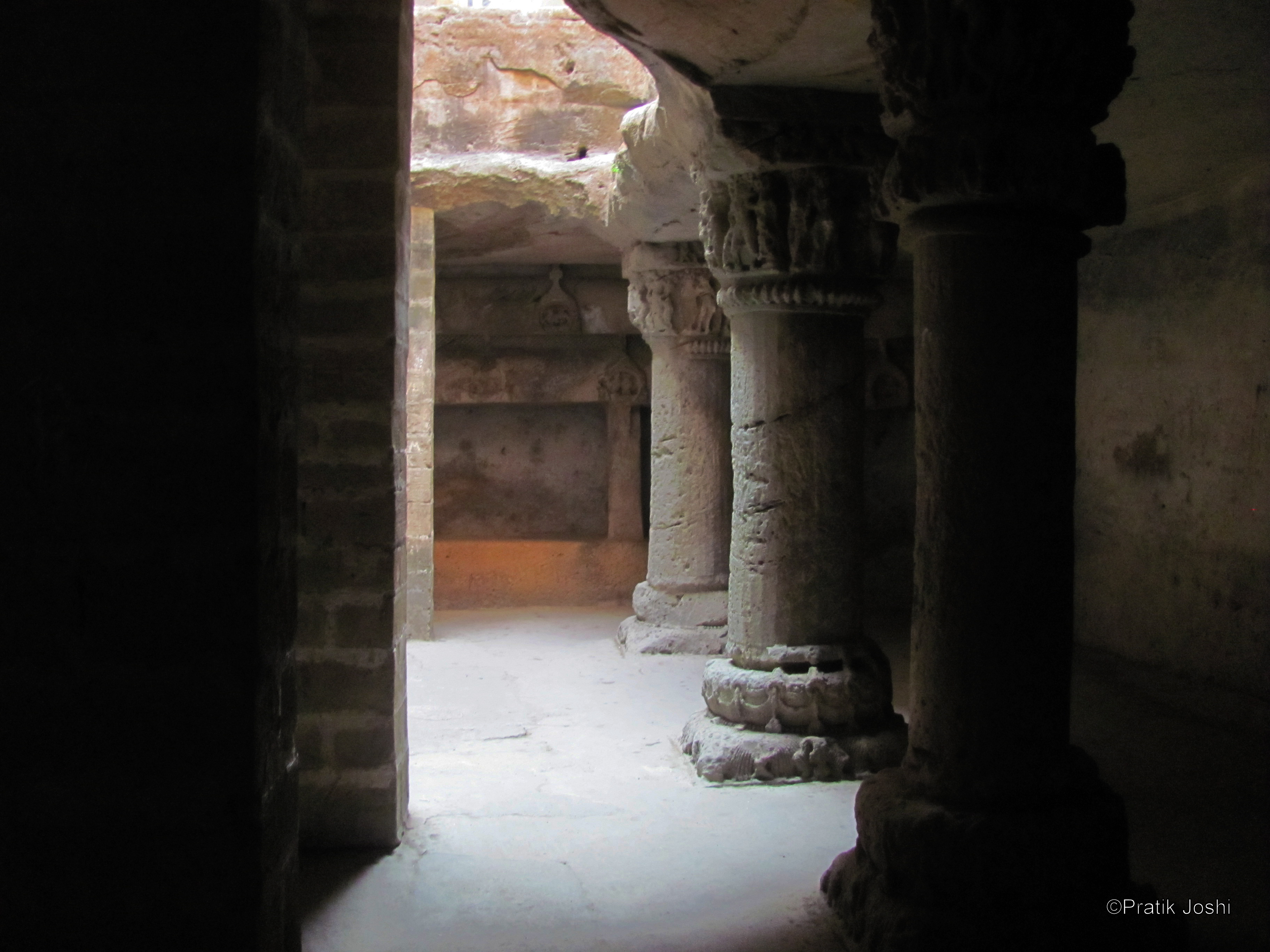
Uperkot caves ornate pillars 1st century AD

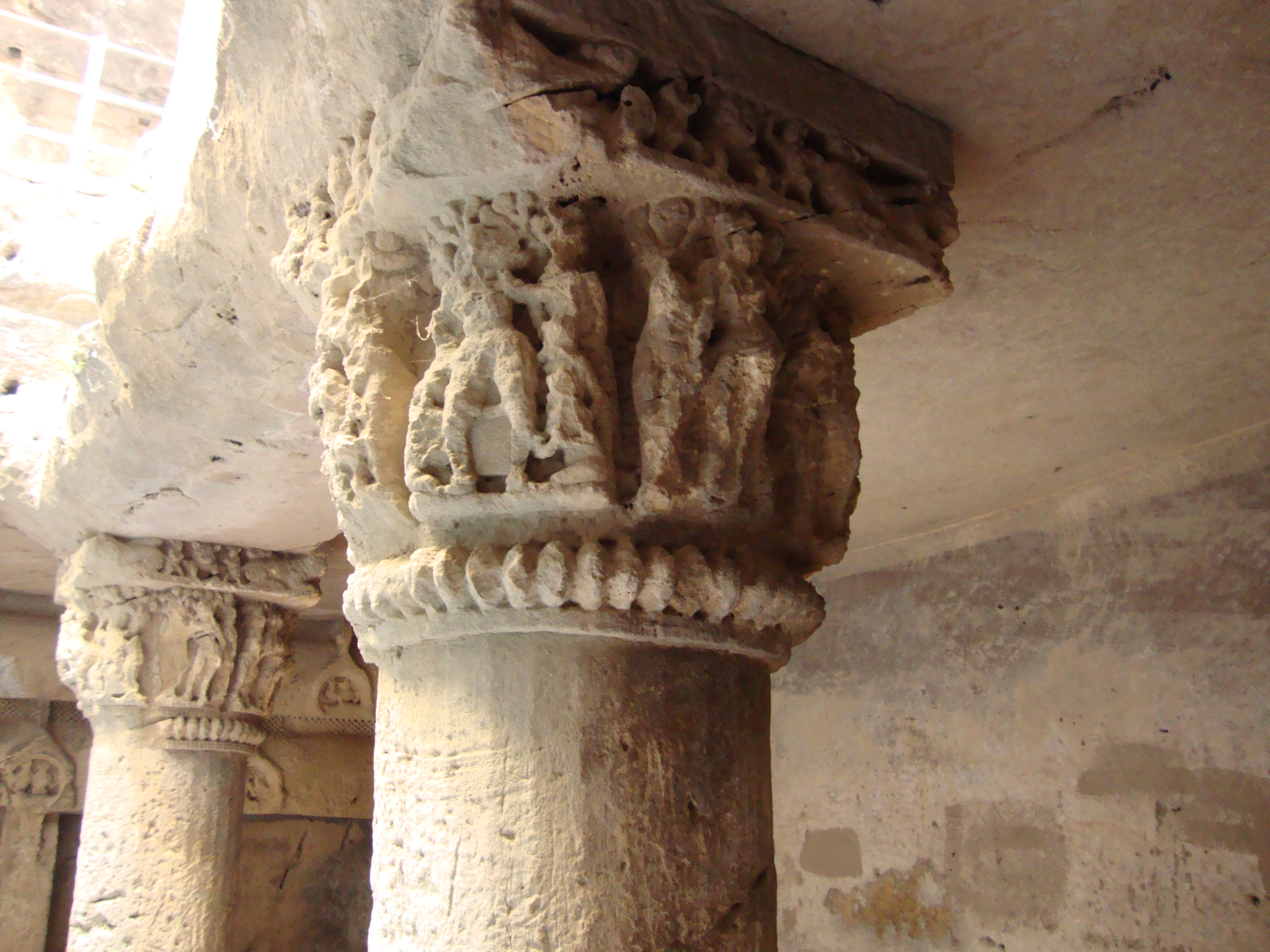
Pillar capitals.

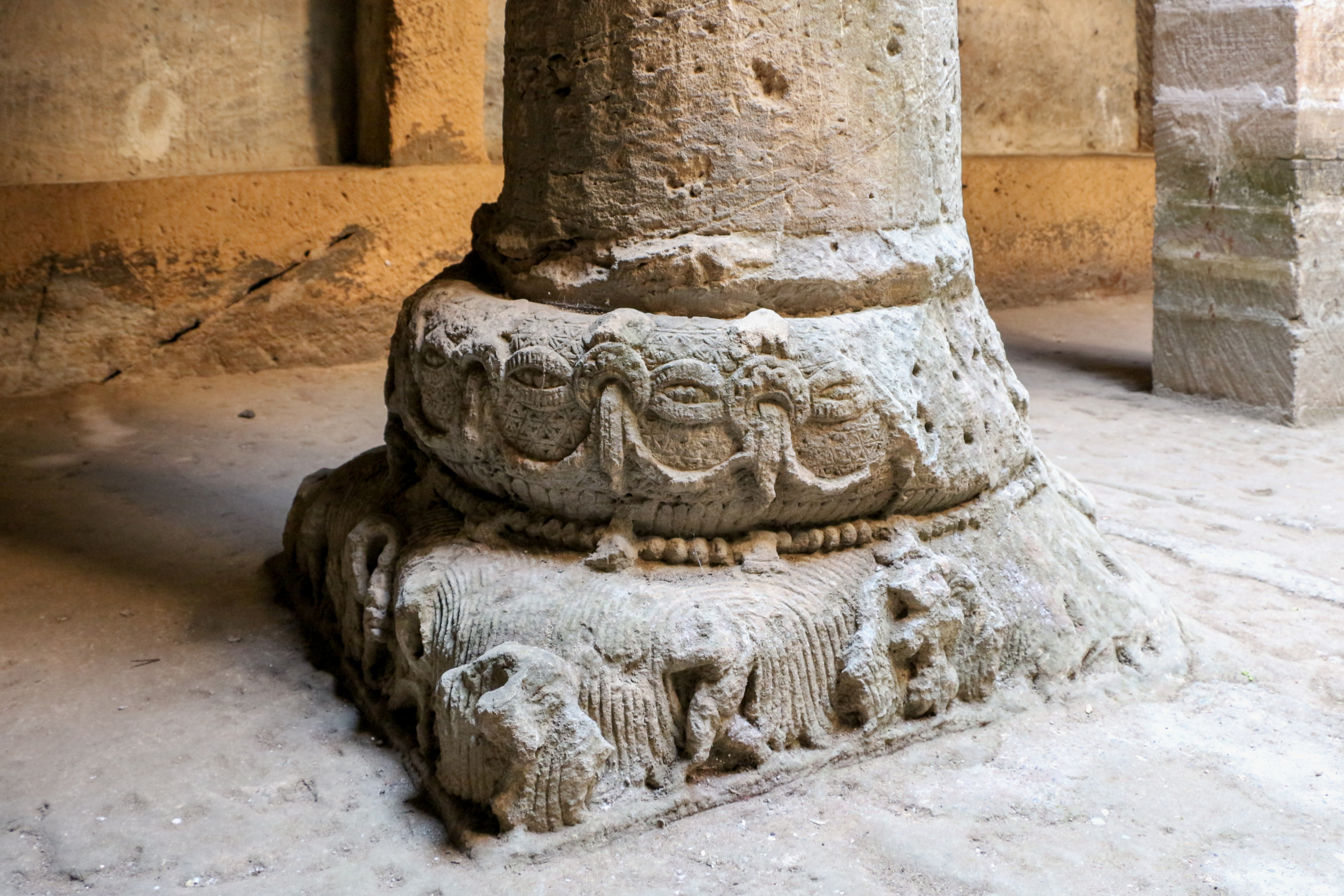
Pillar base.

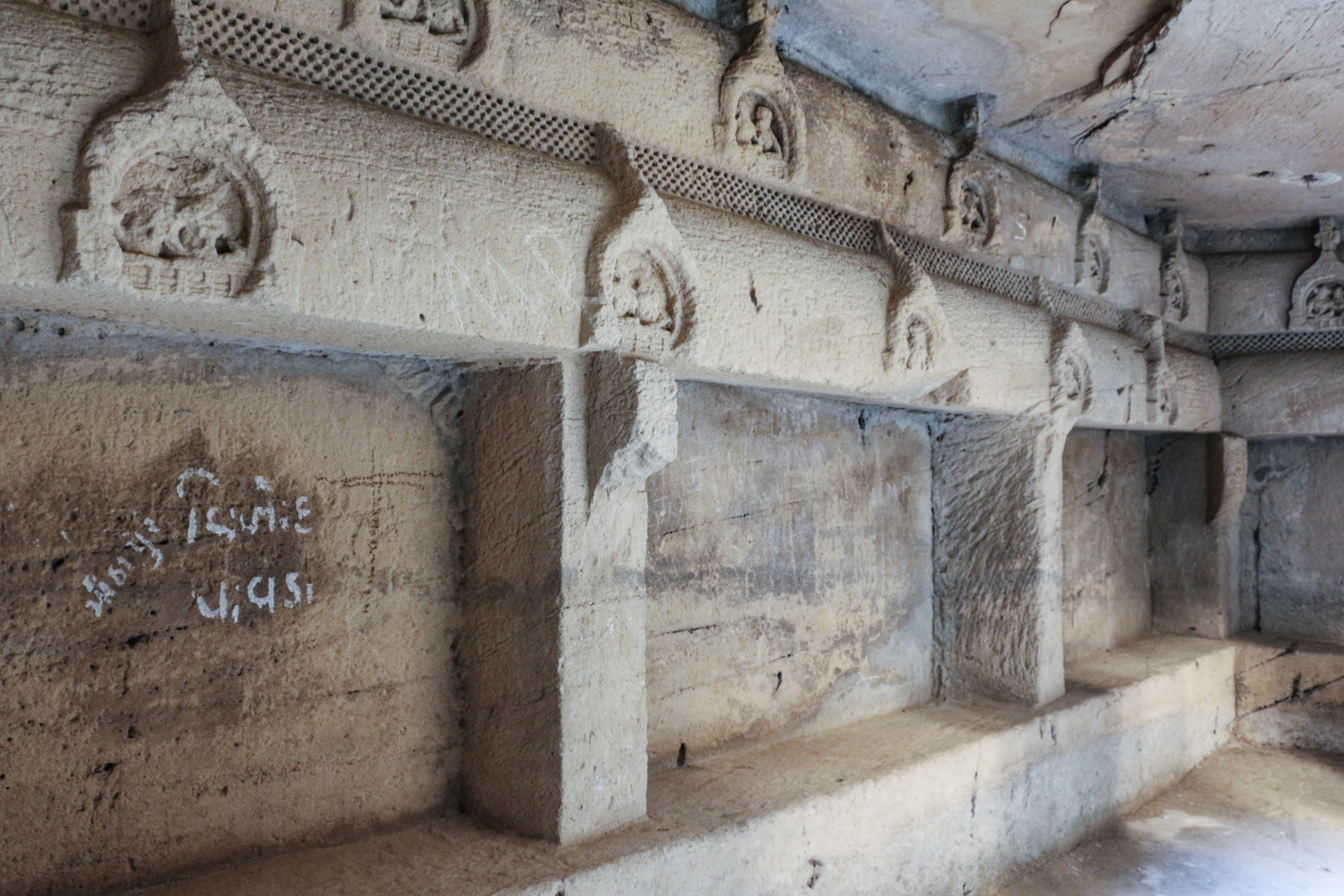
Vihara cells.

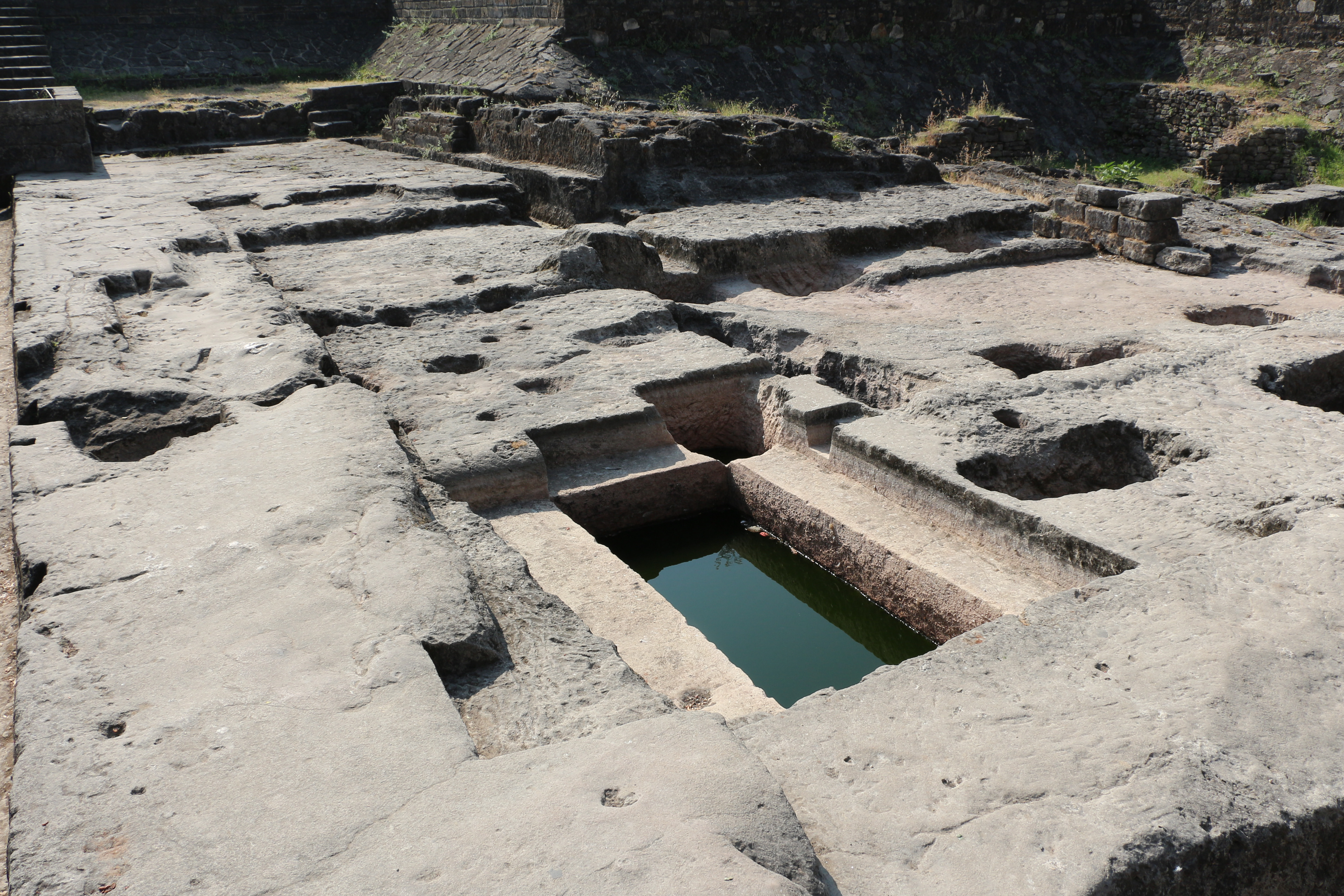
Deep tank.
