= Legendary and early kings of Chudasama dynasty =

The early history of Chudasama dynasty of Saurashtra region (now in Gujarat, India) is almost lost. The bardic legends differs very much in names, order and numbers so they are not considered reliable. Mandalika Kavya, a Sanskrit poem by Gangadhara, gives some information on dynasty but it has little historical value. Some of their inscriptions gives their genealogy but they too differ in order of succession. Ranchhodji Diwan, A. K. Forbes, James Burgess and Gaurishankar Oza had tried to fix genealogy and chronology. They ruled about from Vikram Samvat (VS) 900 to VS 1527 (c. 875 CE to 1472 CE).

James W. Watson, in Gazetteer of the Bombay Presidency: Kathiawar Volume VIII (1884), had given the chronology of Chudasama kings. The early kings in chronology were based on the bardic legends. Harold Wilberforce-Bell wrote The History of Kathiawad from the Earliest Times in 1916. He expanded on the chronology of Watson. He presented following chronology of the early kings: Chudachandra (875-907 CE) founded the dynasty. He was succeeded by Mularaja (907-915 CE), Vishwavarah (915-940 CE), Graharipu (940-982 CE), Kavat (982-1003 CE), Dyas (1003-1010 CE), Navaghana (1025-1044 CE), Khengara (1044-1067 CE), Navaghana (1067-1098 CE), Khengara (1098-1125 CE), Navaghana (1125-1140 CE), Kavat (1140-1152 CE), Jayasimha/Graharipu (1152-1180 CE), Raisimha (1180-1184 CE), Gajaraja/Mahipala (1184-1201 CE), Jayamala (1201-1230 CE), Mahipala (1230-1253 CE), Khengara (1253-1260 CE). The accuracy of this genealogy, chronology and dates are doubtful as it is derived from bardic legends and folklore.

Khengara was succeeded by Mandalika I in 1294 CE.

== Legendary and early kings ==
The bardic accounts are unanimous in ascribing the origin of the Chudasama to Chudachandra of the Samma tribe then ruling at Nagar-Samai or Saminagar (now Thatta, Sindh, Pakistan). He was a nephew of Vala Ram, the ruler of Vamanasthali (now Vanthali) and succeeded him at the close of the ninth or the start of the tenth century or possibly a few years previously. He is mentioned in the Dhandhusar inscription (VS 1445/1389 CE). Chandrachuda was succeeded by his grandson Mularaja, the son of Hamira.

The bards tell that he had conquered the Asir, Gajan (Khambhat) and king named Som or Somo. His capital was at Vanthali, though in other bardic poetry he is called lord of Girnar. He was succeeded by his son Vishwavarah whose fame had spread across Gujarat and the surrounding states such as Mandugadh (Malwa), Parkargadh (Sindh Frontier), and Kach Makran, the Konkan, Kutch, and Kanauj; according to bards. He was succeeded by his son Graharipu.

=== Graharipu ===
Graharipu was a contemporary of the Chaulukya ruler Mularaja. The growing power of the Chudasama dynasty and his acts of harassing the pilgrims to Somnath temple resulted in his conflict with Mularaja. After a major and decisive battle, Mulraja defeated Graharipu. The ruler from Kutch, Laksha had fought alongside Graharipu in the battle and was killed. After this battle, the Chudasama domain was repeatedly attacked by subsequent Chaulukya rulers. He was succeeded by Kavat.

=== Kavat and Dyas ===
According to bardic tales, Kavat was captured and imprisoned by the chief of Shiyal Island off the coast of Saurashtra. He was liberated by his maternal uncle Uga Vala, chief of Talaja, but had hurt his pride unknowingly. Kavat later marched against him and killed him near Chitrasar.

Dyas succeeded Kavat and was defeated and killed by Patan Raja (probably Chaulukya ruler king Durlabharaja). So Chudasama domain fell under Chaulukyas for some years.

=== Navaghana ===
Dyas' young son, Navaghana escaped during the battle with Patan Raja and was taken to Devayat Bodar, who sacrificed their own son Vasan to save Navaghana. He was raised in secrecy. When he reached adulthood, he regained Vamansthali. Another tale says that he defeated Hamir Sumro (probably Soomra ruler) of Sindh when he tried to forcefully capture Jahal, daughter of Devayat, for marriage.

Navaghana was succeeded by his son, Khengara. Khengara was succeeded by another king named Navaghana.

=== Navaghana ===
According to bardic legends, Chaulukya ruler Jayasimha Siddharaja attacked during his reign and he was defeated and became is vassal. He moved capital to Junagadh. He was succeeded by Khengara who had vowed to take revenge.

=== Khengara ===
As promised to his father, Khengara attacked Anahilawada when Jayasimha Siddharaja was at Malwa. He also defeated and killed Hariraj, the chief of Umeta and destroyed the fortress of Bhoira. He also completed his last promise of splitting cheeks of Charan named Mesan. Jayasimha attacked Junagadh when he returned.

Another story tells that Siddharaja wanted to marry Ranakadevi but Khengara married her. So enraged Siddharaja attacked Junagadh. Khengara was defeated due to betrayal of his nephews and his two sons were killed. Ranakadevi was captured but she refused to marry and killed herself by committing sati on the banks of Bhogavo river at Wadhwan to protect her honour. This legend is not considered credible.

=== Successors ===
Jayasimha Siddharaja left a governor at Junagadh but he was soon expelled and another king named Navaghana ascended. He was succeeded by his son Kavat followed by his son Jayasimha. Jayasimha is said to have carried some expeditions in Gujarat and beyond. He was succeeded by Raisimha who was followed by Gajaraja, also known as Mahipala. The bardic tales tell that he was defeated by Vachhraja of Sirsa. Gajaraja was succeeded by Jayamala. He is praised in bardic poetry, Jayamal Jasvarnan.

Mahipala succeeded Jayamala. He sent an army under a general Motichand against rebelling Kathis assembled at Kotra but defeated. He went again in person with an army supported by the Vala chief of Dhank. The Kathis still did not suffer serious defeat and managed to capture few villages around Dhank.

Mahipala was succeeded by his son Khengara who finally subdued Kathis, expelled them from villages which they had occupied and restored them to the Dhank chief. According to bardic tales, Vala Arjanji of Dhank and Kalian Seth were the chief men of the court of Khengara. They disagreed for the post of chief minister so the post was given to Malan Mehta. Enraged Kalian Mehta caused Malan Mehta to be assassinated. Khengara learned this and Kalian Mehta was put to death on his orders and appointed Mahidhar, son of Malan Mehta, as the chief minister. Lovo, son of Kalian Seth, when grew up, went to Delhi and had persuaded the Sultan of Delhi to send army to Gujarat. Another tale says, Khengara and Arjanji are said to have ravished a Mer female. Her cries attracted her kindred, who wounded both Arjanji and Khengara so grievously that they subsequently both died of their wounds.

Khengara was succeeded by Mandalika I in 1294 CE. During his reign the Delhi Sultanate attacked and conquered Gujarat.
