= Bhadrod =

- Bhadrod, Gujarat, India Bhadrod (India)
- Coordinates: 21.13°N 71.80°E
- Country: India
- State: Gujarat
- Region: Saurashtra

Languages
  - Official: Gujarati,
- Time zone: UTC+5:30 (IST)
- PIN: 364295
- Telephone code: (+91)
- Vehicle registration: GJ-04

Bhadrod is a village in Mahuva Taluka of Bhavnagar district, Gujarat, India. It is situated four miles north east of Mahuva and fifty-one miles south-west of Bhavnagar. It is built on the western bank of the Bhadrodi river.

== History ==
Bhadrod is associated with Rukmi, brother of Rukmini. It is a place where he overtook Krishna when he was carrying off that lady, and a battle was fought, in which Rukmi was defeated and taken prisoner, and only released after Krishna had contemptuously caused his moustache and whiskers and the hair of his head shaved off. As Rukmi had solemnly sworn never to return to Kundinapuri unless victorious and unless he should in prison Krishna and bring back his sister Rukmini, he was much perplexed how to act now that he had been not only defeated but disgraced. He finally resolved to reside on the battle-field, and established there a small temple of Mahadev, which he named Bhadreshvar. By degrees a village sprung up, first called Bhadranagar which has by degrees been corrupted into Bhadrod.

When the Valas were forced to leave Talaja by the Muslims in the time of Selait Vala (about 1544), they retired to Bhadrod and remained here for some time. During their rule, Gundala, between Nikol and Kalsar, was the port of Bhadrod. It is now waste, and there stands only a deserted temple of Hanuman on the old site. This temple is still called the Gandalio Hanuman. The Khasias under Vijo and Misri Khasia conquered Mahuva and Bhadrod in about 1744 from the Valas, and Misri Khasia established himself at Bhadrod, while Vijo Khasia resided at Mahuva. Here the Khasias remained till 1784, when they were conquered by Thakor Vakhatsinghji of Bhavnagar State. Since then Bhadrod was under Bhavnagar.

When the Valas reigned at Talaja, Bhadrod belonged to them. Uga Vala of this line is a favourite local hero, and is said to have rescued Ra Kavat, the Chudasama king of Junagadh from the confinement of the chief of Shiyal Island.

Four silver coins of the Indo-Greek monarch Apollodotus I were found at Bhadrod and one was found at Dhank, another ancient Vala settlement.
