= Dyas (king) =

Dyas, also spelled Diyas, was an 11th-century Chudasama king of Saurashtra region of western India mentioned in bardic literature and folklore.

== In bardic literature and folklore ==
During his reign, the Raja (king) of Patan invaded his dominions and conquered the capital town of Vamanasthali (now Vanthali). So Dyas fled to the Uparkot of Junagadh to which the Raja laid siege. Some sources name the Raja as Durlabhsen (possibly Durlabharaja). Different reasons are assigned for the war but the accounts are unanimous in representing Dyas to have insulted one of the ladies of the Raja's family while on a pilgrimage to Girnar near Junagadh. After much difficulty the Uparkot was taken.

When Dyas died, his son Navagahana was a child and was secretly raised. After few years of reign by governors appointed from Patan, Navaghana regained the throne when he became an adult.

== Dates ==
According to bardic tales and folklore, he was a son and the successor of Kavat and reigned from Vamanasthali (now Vanthali) from 1003 CE to 1010 CE.
