= Navaghana (king) =

Navaghana was an early Chudasama rajput king known only from the ballads and folklore of Saurashtra of Gujarat, India. His capital was at Vamanasthali (now Vanthali) which he later moved to Junagadh during his last years of reign.

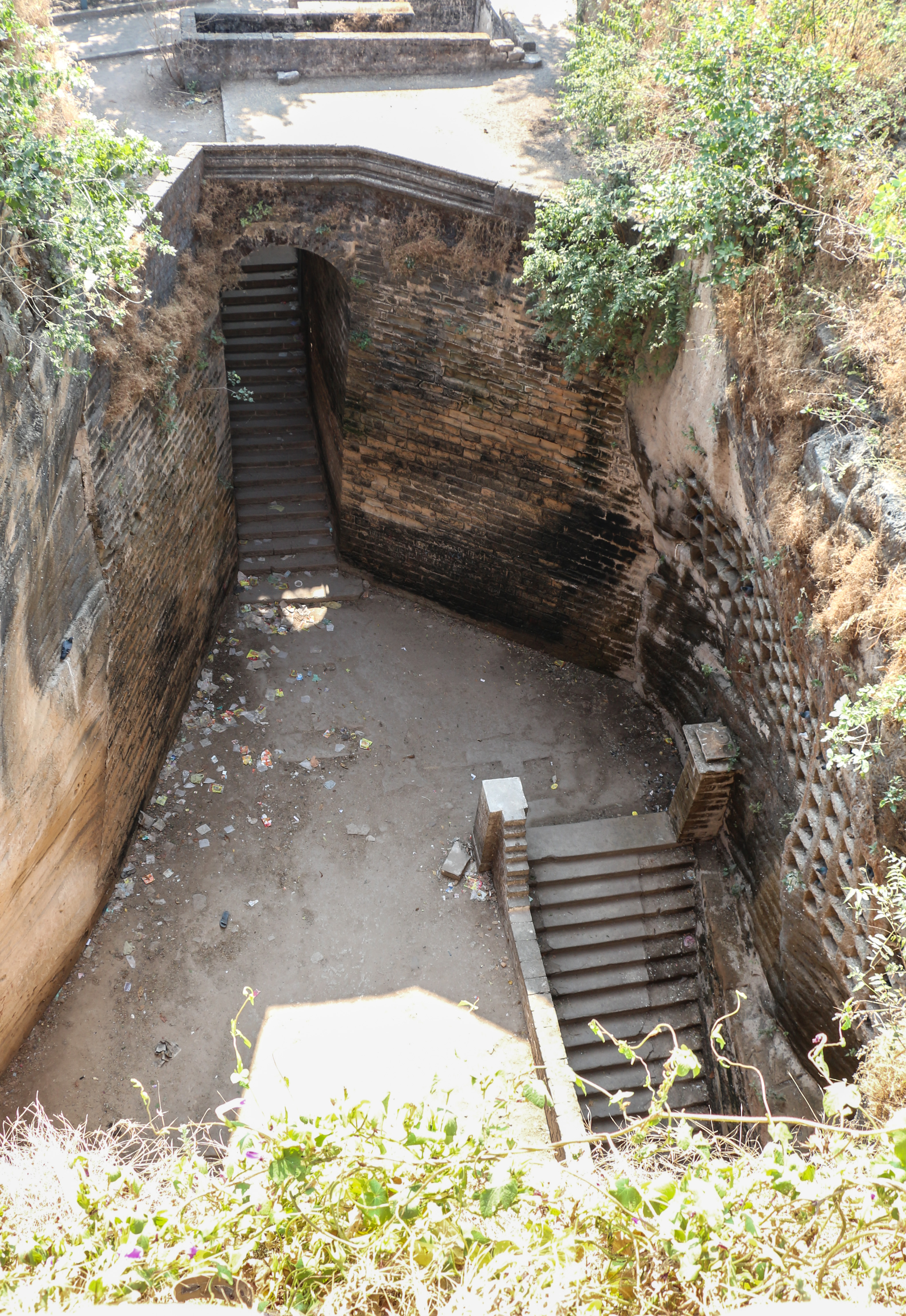
Navghan Kuvo, a well attributed to Navaghana

== In bardic literature ==
The bardic literature says his father Dyas was defeated by Patan Raja (Chaulukya king) and Navaghana was rescued. When Navaghana grew up, he regained the throne. He may have been benefited by weakened Chaulukyas due to the invasion of Mahmud Ghazni who attacked desecrated the Somnath temple in 1026 CE. Navaghana came to power soon after the attack.

== Successors ==
According to bardic tales and folklore, Navaghana reigned from 1026 CE to 1044 CE and he was succeeded by his son Khengara who reigned for 23 years (1144-1167 CE), followed by his son Navaghana. Udayamati, wife of Chaulukya ruler Bhima I, was a daughter of his son Khengara.

== Cultural activities ==
The construction of Navghan Kuvo, a stepwell in the Uparkot Fort, is attributed to him. It is considered an oldest example of stepwell in Gujarat by some scholars.
