= Devayat Bodar =

Legendary warrior from Gujarat, India

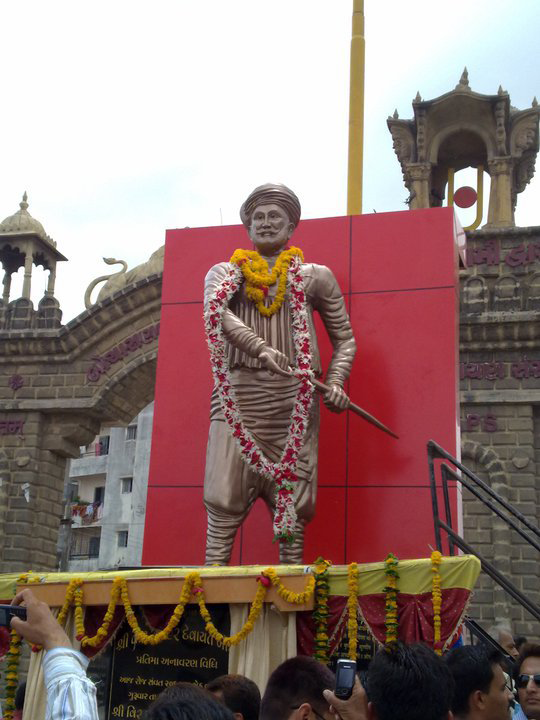
Statue of Devayat Bodar at Junagadh, Gujarat, India

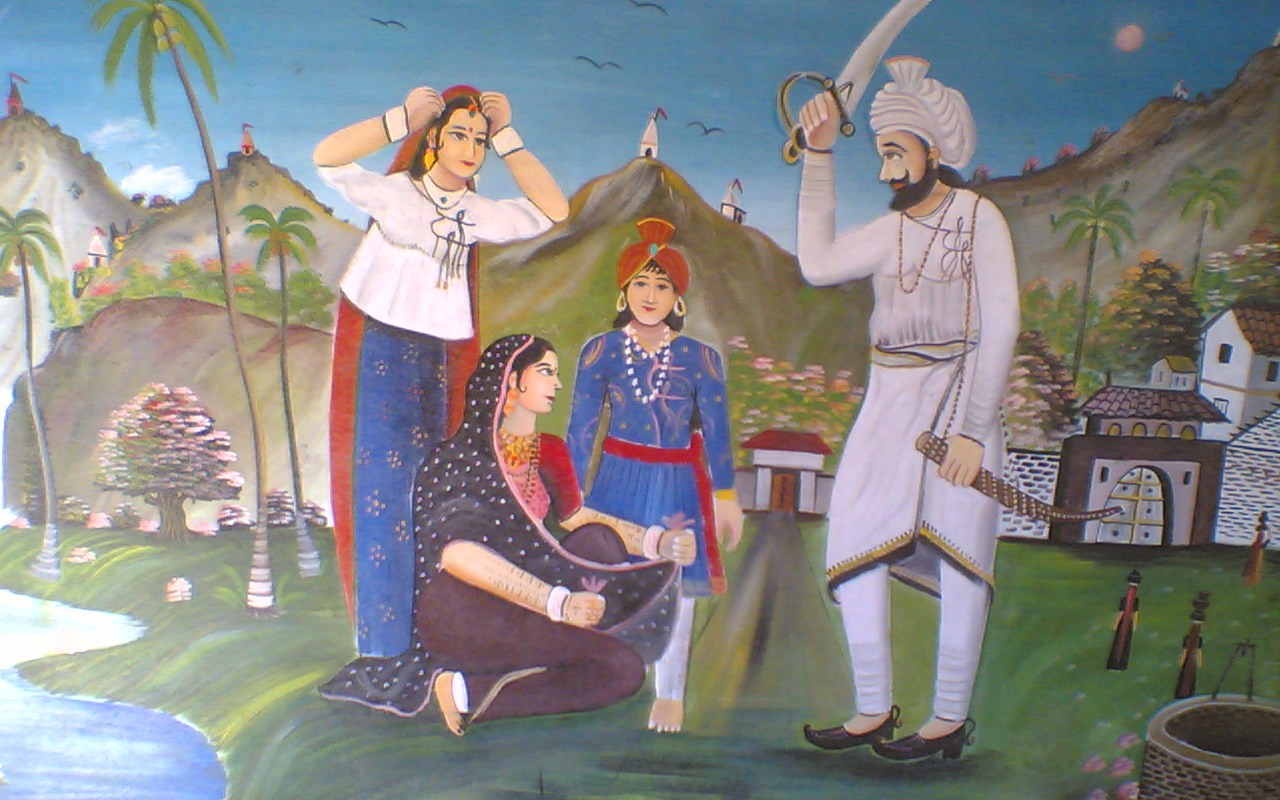
21st-century painting of Devayat Bodar sacrifice his own son Uga in front of his wife, daughter, villagers and Solanki Sipahis to save Ra Navghan in Alidar - Bodidar village

Devayat Bodar (c. 900 AD - 1025 AD) was an Ahir chieftain of Gujarat. He was an important figure known for his bravery, sacrifice and love for land, with whose help Ra' Navghan, Chudasama ruler (son of Ra' Dias) got the throne of Sorath (currently nearby area of Vansthali-Junagadh) back from Patan ruler Durlabhraj Solanki and Later became king of Saurashtra region.

Devayat Bodar who was loyal to the Ra' kings brought Navghan as his own child. The Solanki king sent his army to find the Kunwar, intending to kill the only son of Ra' Diyas and end his dynasty. The sipahis searched and reached Devayat's village Alidar-bolidar. Where the couple saved Ra' Navaghan by sacrificing their own son Vasana (Uga).

== Early life ==
Geneolgy of Abhira dynasty of Chudasama clan and Devayat Bodar

Devayat Bodar was born in Alidar-Bodidar village of Gujarat. He had a daughter named Jahal and a son named Uga (Vahan) from his wife Sonal (The Literary name is Saidhi Bai).

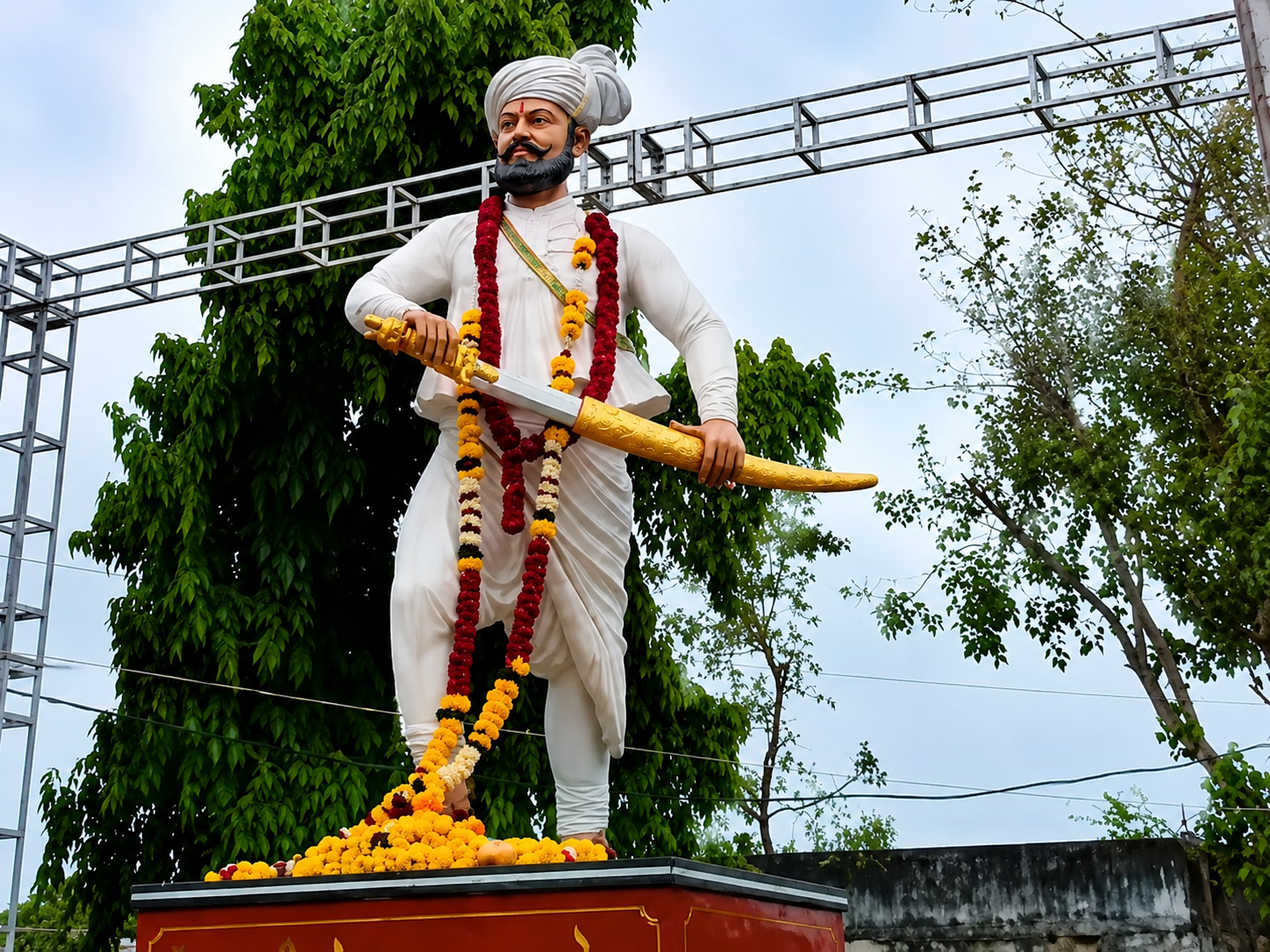
દેવાયત આપા બોદર (આશરે 960–1025 ઈસવી) યદુવંશી ક્ષત્રિય આહીર હતા. તેમની સહાયથી રા’ નવઘણ જુનાગઢના રાજા બન્યા હતા. દેવાયત આપા બોદરે રા’ નવઘણને સોલંકી રાજાથી બચાવવા પોતાના “ઉગા” નામના પુત્રનું બલિદાન આપ્યું હતું.

== See also ==
- Ahir
- History of Gujarat
- Halar
