= Jayasimha (Chudasama dynasty) =

Jayasimha was an early Chudasama king known only from the ballads and folklore of Saurashtra region of Gujarat, India.

== In bardic legends ==
The bards explain that the names Dyas and Gario are both titles, Dyas meaning the giver and Gario (Grahario) the seizer. They say that the real name of this chieftain was Jayasimha but that his seizing on Kanauj obtained for him the title of Gario and his munificence caused him to be known as Dyas. His seizure of Kanauj is thus explained: Jayasimha was a connection of the celebrated Jayachandra of Kanauj and is said to have been left by that chieftain in charge of Kanauj when Jayachandra went forth to war with Prithviraj Chauhan. On Jayachandra's return defeated. Jayasimha refused to permit him to enter and retained possession of the place. For this achievement, he was called Grahario or Gario. Subsequently terms were arranged between Jayachandra and Jayasimha and the latter returned to Sorath conquering Gwalior on his return journey and defeating the Raja of Mewar. Jayasimha afterwards joined the Chaulukya king Bhimdev in his warfare with Prithviraj and is alluded to in the Prithviraj Raso as Chudasama Jayasimha according to the Ras Mala of Alexander Kinloch Forbes. On the death of this chieftain his queen committed sati. He was succeeded by his son Raisimha.

The historical accuracy of these bardic legends is doubtful.

== Dates and succession ==
It is difficult to decide the correct dates of the king as the information about him is derived only from bardic tales and folklore. According to the Gazetteer of the Bombay Presidency, Jayasimha reigned from 1152-1180 CE and he was succeeded by Raisimha (1180-1184 CE) followed by Gajaraja/Mahipala (1184-1201 CE). Though these dates are not reliable.
