= Ra Khengar Vav =

General information
- Type: Stepwell
- Architectural style: Indian architecture
- Location: Koyliphatak near Vanthali, Junagadh district, Gujarat, India
- Coordinates: 21.4917454°N 70.3833079°E
- Construction started: c. 1230 CE
- Completed: c. 1240 CE

Design and construction
- Architect: Local
- Main contractor: Tejapala
- Designations: ASI State Protected Monument No. S-GJ-170

Ra Khengar Vav or Ra Khengar stepwell is a 13th-century stepwell located near Koyliphatak village between Vanthali and Junagadh in Gujarat, India.

== History ==
Tejapala, a minister in Vaghela court who is known along with his brother Vastupala, constructed the stepwell for the benefit of travellers. It is built in the first half of the 13th century CE, probably between 1230 and 1240. The construction of the stepwell between Tejalapura or Jirnadurga (modern Junagadh) and Vamanasthali (modern Vanthali) is mentioned in the Jinaharsha's Vastupala-Charita (dated Vikram Samvat 1497 or 1441 CE), a biography of Vastupala. So it is identified with Ra Khengar stepwell by Madhusudan Dhaky and dated between 1230 and 1240. The dating is also supported by the stylistic evidences. The construction is mistakenly attributed to Chudasama ruler Khengara, who reigned from about 1098 to 1125 CE.

It is a State Protected Monument (S-GJ-170) and is under management by the Agriculture Department of the Government of Gujarat.

== Architecture ==
The stepwell is built in north-south direction with steps in the north and shaft well in the south. The pillars and the walls of the stepwell is ornamented with carvings. There are balconies on the both sides at the first landing by the steps. The pavilion with tiled roof on the south end is later addition of 19th century during the reign of Babi dynasty in Junagadh. There is a circumambulatory passage around the well shaft.

== See also ==
- History of stepwells in Gujarat
