= Gajaraja =

Gajaraja, also known as Mahipala, was an early Chudasama king known only from the ballads and folklore of Saurashtra region of Gujarat, India.

== In bardic legends ==
It is difficult to decide the correct dates of the king as the information about him is derived only from bardic tales and folklore. According to the Gazetteer of the Bombay Presidency, Mahipala had succeeded his father Raisimha.

During his reign, the Raja Vachhraja (Vatsaraja) of Sirsa (now in Haryana) invaded Sorath and marched against Junagadh but was defeated and taken prisoner by Gajaraja. Afterwards Gajaraja sent his senapati (general) Chudamani and an army to north and declared that he would give his daughter Motinade to whomsoever should be able to defeat him. Chudamani marched to Mahoba where resided Ala and Udal, maternal cousins of Mal Khan, son of Vachhraja of Sirsa who had succeeded his father on the throne. They accepted Chudamani's challenge on behalf of Mal Khan and defeated his army. Udal vanquishing Chudamani in single combat. Then the marriage was agreed upon but it was arranged that another battle should take place at Junagadh and each party invited their supporters to fight. On Mal Khan's side was Lakhan of Kanauj, Ramaya of Gujargadh, Raja Prithvipat, Raja Makranda of Mohangadh and others while on Gajaraja's side were many chieftains of equal rank. After some fighting Gajaraja was worsted and Mal Khan was married to Motinade. Gajaraja was succeeded by his son Jayamala.

The historical accuracy of these bardic legends is doubtful.

== Dates and succession ==
It is difficult to decide the correct dates of the king as the information about him is derived only from bardic tales and folklore. According to the Gazetteer of the Bombay Presidency, he was a son and the successor of Raisimha and reigned from 1184 CE to 1201 CE and succeeded by Jayamala (1201-1230 CE), Mahipala (1230-1253 CE), Khengara (1253-1260 CE). Khengara was succeeded by Mandalika I (1294-1306 CE).
