= Chudachandra =

Legendary Indian king

Chudachandra, also known as Chadrachuda or simply Chuda, was the founder of the Chudasama dynasty of Saurashtra (now in Gujarat, India).

== Founder of the Chudasama dynasty ==
According to bardic tales and limited historical records, after the fall of Vallabhi ruled by Maitrakas, the Chavda Governor of Vamansthali (now Vanthli) near Junagadh became independent. His descendants ruled till the later part of 9th century till the ruler Vala Ram.

The bardic accounts are unanimous in ascribing the origin of the Chudasama to Chudachandra, a Rajput of the Samma tribe then ruling at Nagar-Samai or Saminagar (now Thatta, Sindh, Pakistan); and they also agree that before his arrival in the peninsula, Vala Ram was the ruler of Vamanasthali (now Vanthali). Some say that Vala had no son, but that his sister had married the father of Chudachandra, and that the Vala Ram kept his nephew Chudachandra at Vamanasthali, and finally appointed him his successor. Others say that Vala Ram had a son, but that he quarreled with Chudachandra, and that rather than that this son should have Vamanasthali, Vala Ram expelled him from the country. All agree that Chudachandra succeeded him. There are very few bardic verses regarding Chudachandra, but he is mentioned in the Dhandhusar inscription (VS 1445/1389 CE), and there is a play on his name, viz. that as Chandrachuda (Shiva) placed the moon (Chandra) on his head (Chuda) so Chudachandra was considered by the kings of the neighbouring countries as Chudasaman or as their head; hence Chudasama, but no doubt the real derivation is Chuda from Chudachandra's name, and Sama from the name of his tribe. Chudachandra is called Rai Chuda in bardic poetry.

It is almost certain that Chudachandra reigned at Vamanathali, and that he founded the rule of the Chudasama dynasty in Saurashtra at the close of the ninth or the start of the tenth century or possibly a few years previously. According to bards and traditional dates, he succeeded around 875 CE. Chudachandra had a son named Hamira, but it is doubtful whether he succeeded his father, and it seems most probable that he died during his father's lifetime, and that Chudachandra was succeeded by his grandson Mularaja, the son of Hamira.

The historical accuracy of these bardic legends is doubtful.
