= Graharipu =

Chudasama king from 941 to 996

Param Shaiv Maharajadhiraja Girnaradhipati
- Reign: c. 941 – c. 996 CE
- Predecessor: Vishvāvaraha (Chudasama dynasty)
- Successor: Kavat
- Dynasty: Chudasama

Graharipu (also known as Grahasipu or Grahario I) was a 10th-century ruler of the Chudasama dynasty who ruled parts of the Saurashtra region of present-day Gujarat, India, from his capital at Vamanasthali (modern Vanthali). He was a contemporary of Mularaja, the first Chaulukya ruler of Anahilapataka (modern Patan). Graharipu is also associated with the construction or restoration of Durgapalli (modern Uparkot) at Junagadh.

Hemachandra, in the Dvyashraya-Kavya, describes Prince Graharipu as ruling at Vanthali near Junagadh.

The Chudasama began to rule in southern and western Saurashtra from the second half of the 10th century A.D. Their capital was Vamanshtali (modern Vanthali), nine miles west of Junagadh. They became very powerful during the reign of Graharipu, defeating the Saindhavas and the Chaulukyas.

The growing power of the Chudasama dynasty and the acts of harassing the pilgrims of Somnath Temple resulted in Graharipu's conflict with Mularaja. After a major and decisive battle, Mularaja is said to have defeated Graharipu. The ruler from Kutch, Laksha, had fought alongside Graharipu in the battle and was killed. After this battle, the domain was repeatedly attacked by subsequent Chaulukya rulers.

== Battle with Mularaja ==
According to Hemachandra, who was patronized by the Chaulukyas, the Chaulukya king Mularaja defeated Graharipu. No other Chaulukya-era accounts mention this victory.

Hemachandra states that one night Mahadeva appeared in Mularaja's dream and ordered him to vanquish Graharipu. In the morning, Mularaja consulted his ministers Jambaka and Jehula because he was concerned about difficulties faced by the pilgrims who visited Prabhasa in Saurashtra. According to Abhayatilakagani, Jambaka was Mularaja's Mahamantri (chief minister), while Jehula, the Ranaka of Kahiralu (now Kheralu), was his Mahapradhana (prime minister). Jehula portrayed Graharipu as a tyrant who tortured pilgrims and indulged in vices such as eating flesh, drinking wine, and hunting deer in sacred places. Jambaka described Graharipu as a very strong king and declared that only Mularaja was capable of defeating him. Both the ministers urged Mularaja to attack Graharipu.

Mularaja launched a campaign against Graharipu on the day of Vijayadashami. Graharipu attempted a peaceful resolution through a messenger, assuring Mularaja that he bore no enmity towards him. However, Mularaja turned the messenger away and continued his march. Graharipu then began preparations for war. His allies included Medas, Laksha, and a king named Sindhuraja. After the war began, he was joined by a mleccha chief, whom Hemachandra's commentator Abhayatilaka Gani identified as a Turushka.

Mularaja was supported by the Gangamaha of Gangadvara, his younger brother Mahirata, Revatimitra, and Shailaprastha. The Paramara king of Abu and Srimala also joined him. His allies included the Bhillas and the Kauravas. After the battle began, additional supporters, including the king of Saptakashi and a number of Gujarati soldiers, joined him.

The battle took place on the river Jambumali, identified as the Bhogavo River in Saurashtra. The fighting continued inconclusively for two days. On the third day, Mularaja entered the battlefield on an elephant, and Graharipu mounted his own elephant in anger. Mularaja overpowered Graharipu in single combat, threw him down from his elephant, and had him bound with ropes.

Laksha, wearing white garments, rushed forward and rebuked Mularaja, calling him "Mula". Laksha asked Mularaja to release Graharipu, but Mularaja refused on the grounds that the captive was a beef-eater. This led to another single combat, in which Mularaja killed Laksha with a spear. The men of Saurashtra then submitted to Mularaja, dressed as women. Graharipu's queen and children requested that Mularaja release him, and he agreed, before visiting Prabhasa. According to Abhayatilakagani, Mularaja prayed on the day of Shivaratri. Within five to six days, he returned to his capital with 108 elephants.

The fight between Mularaja and Laksha is also described by the 14th-century writer Merutunga in Prabandhachintamani. According to this version, Laksha (or Lakha) was the ruler of Kaccha. He was the son of Phulada and Kamalata, a daughter of the Paramara king Kirtiraja. Laksha had repulsed Mularaja's attacks eleven times. However, in their twelfth encounter, Mularaja besieged his fort at Kapilkot (now Kera, Kutch), killed him, and trod him on his beard. Enraged by his insult, Laksha's mother cursed Mularaja's family to be afflicted with leprosy. A similar account is also given in Kumarapalacharita. According to K. K. Shastri, this account is more trustworthy.

Laksha appears to have been a historical figure, as he has been mentioned in several other chronicles. The other kings listed by Hemachandra appear to be fictional. Historian Asoke Majumdar theorizes that Mularaja attacked Graharipu on "some flimsy pretext", arguing that Mahadeva's appearance in a dream was a popular device used by Sanskrit authors to justify the otherwise inexcusable actions of their heroes. Majumdar further notes that Mularaja's descendants continued to fight the kings of Kaccha and Saurashtra, suggesting that he succeeded in subjugating these territories only partially.

== In bardic literature ==
According to bardic poems, he was married to a sister of Uga Vala, the chief of Talaja. Bardic literature also states that he was the successor of Vishwavarah and was succeeded by Kavat. He possibly ruled from 945 CE to 982 CE.
