= Uga Vala =

Uga was a Vala chief of Talaja in Saurashtra region of modern Gujarat state of India. He ruled the region around the end of 10th century. He is popular folk hero of bardic poetry of region.

== Tales in bardic literature ==
Uga Vala was a maternal uncle of Ra Kavat, the Chudasama ruler of Saurashtra. Uga Vala's sister was married to Kavat's father Graharipu. On one occasion when all the warriors were relating their achievements before Kavat, all extolled Uga Vala so much that the Ra grew jealous, and said to Uga Vala that he was a good warrior when aided by Vanthali but otherwise not of much account. Vala Uga, however, boasted that he could manage without the aid of Vanthali, the Chudasama capital, and said metaphorically that he could clap hands with one palm i.e. without the assistance of the Ra. He then left the court in anger and returned to Talaja.

Viramdeva Parmar, (Note: In some versions of the legend, the chief is referred as Meghanand Chavada. In some version he is referred as Anant Chavda.) the chief who held Shiyal Island, which is one of a group of three islands off the coast of Saurashtra, near Jafrabad. It is said that he was contrived to capture many Rajas by his stratagems and confined them there in a wooden cage. At last, he captured chiefs of all the thirty six races except the Yadava on his island. As he wished to capture Kavat who was Yadava, he persuaded him to visit him on board of his ship which was riding at anchor near Prabhas Patan and there treacherously captured him, and sailing off with him to the Shiyal island confined him there with the other chiefs in the wooden cage.

Kavat, now in prison sent the following message to Uga Vala by means of a wandering minstrel (a bard) who had passed by his prison:

Grief at his heart and a wound on his head; Say to Uga Vala, Kavat is in the wooden cage; You said that when occasion arose that you Uga, the Vala lord of Talaja, could clap hands with one palm. (Note: The Duha in Gujarati: છાતી ઉપર શેરડો, માથા ઉપર વાઢ; ભણજો વાળા ઉગલા કટ પાંજરે કંવાટ; તુની કે'તો તક આવયા, તાળી તળાજા ધણી, વાળા હવે વજાડ્યા એક હાથે ઉગલા.)

Take your bow in your hand,

So that the crow may not sit on the branch;
If you cannot clap hands with one palm,
Then clap hands, O Uga, with both palms.
The days pass with difficulty,
And an hour seems like a month,
Waiting for you, the Vala,

I have wept out my eyes, O Uga. (Note: The Duha in Gujarati: કર કમાન ગ્રહીને, કાગ ના બેસે ડાળી; એ હાથે ના પડે ઉગલા, તો બે હાથે દો તાલી. દિવસ વીતે દોહ્લ્યા, ઘડી માસ પ્રમાણ, વાળા જોતા વાટ, આંખૈયો ગઈ ઉગલા.)

On hearing of the capture of Kavat, Uga Vala set off with a large army to release him, and arrived at the Shiyal Island. After obtaining access to the island by a stratagem, he put the garrison to the sword and slew Viramdeva. In his anxiety to release Kavat, he burst open the wooden cage with a kick. In doing this his foot accidentally struck Kavat. Kavat was much enraged at this and though Uga Vala made much submission to him, he treasured up the grudge, and after returning to Vanthali he led an army against Vala Uga and finally killed him near Chitrasar in Babariavad where his paliya (memorial stone) now stands.

Alternate version says that Uga Vala has spared Shiyal Island chief's life. It is said that when he forced his way to the Shiyal Island chief's palace seeking him, that his wife met him and besought him to spare her husband's life in the following stanza:

You have slain seven hundred heroes,

And killed five hundred Pathans;
But if you slay Anant, (Note: see Note A.) who alone remains, O Uga,

Then let there be Ebhal (Note: Uga Vala's ancestor.) Vala's oath on you. (Note: The Duha in Gujarati: સાંતશે શૂરા મરીયા, પાંચશે મરીયા પઠાણ; એક અનંત મારે ઉગલા, તો તને એભલ વાળાની આણ.)

Thus adjured, Uga Vala spared Shiyal Island chief's life, but released all the chiefs whom he had imprisoned.

It is said that Uga Vala's sister came to visit her brother's paliya but found several memorial stones and knew not which was that of her brother In her grief she implored her brother to give her a sign as to which was his paliya and on this Uga Vala's paliya bent forward to greet her. Hence this paliya does not exactly face the east. It is still bending forward as it is supposed to have done to greet his sister.
