= Kavat (king) =

Member of the Chudasama dynasty

Kavat (Gujarati: કંવાટ) was a 10th-century Chudasama king of Saurashtra region of western India mentioned in the bardic literature. According to bardic tales, he was captured and imprisoned by the chief of Shiyal Island. He was liberated by his maternal uncle Uga Vala, chief of Talaja, but had hurt his pride unknowingly. Kavat later marched against him and killed him near Chitrasar.

== In bardic literature ==
Anant Chavda, (Note: In some versions of the legend, the chief is referred as Meghanand Chavada. In some version he is referred as Viramdeva Parmar.) the chief who held Shiyal Island off the coast of Saurashtra, near Jafrabad. He had captured several chiefs of villages on his island. He met Kavat on a ship near Prabhas Patan and captured him and confined him on the island. Kavat's maternal uncle named Uga Vala, chief of Talaja, realised this so he invaded Shiyal Island and killed Viramdeva. When releasing Kavat, he accidentally hit him with his foot. So Kawat became angry and vowed vengeance on his uncle. He later marched against Uga Vala with an army, he defeated him, and killed him near Chitrasar.

== Dates and succession ==
According to bardic tales and folklore, he was a son and the successor of Graharipu and reigned from Vamanasthali (now Vanthali) possibly from 982 CE to 1003 CE. He was succeeded by his son, Dyas.
