= Vanthali =

Vanthli
- Town
- Location in Gujarat, India Vanthli (India)
- Coordinates: 21°28′40″N 70°19′50″E
- Country: India
- State: Gujarat
- District: Junagadh

Population (2015)
  - Total: 21,891

Languages
  - Official: Gujarati, Hindi
- Time zone: UTC+5:30 (IST)
- Vehicle registration: GJ11
- Website: gujaratindia.com

Vanthali is a town and a municipality in Junagadh district in the Indian state of Gujarat.

== History ==
Vanthali, historically known as Vamanasthali, was the capital of the Abhiras after they gained control over the southern and western parts of Saurashtra under their king Graharipu in the latter half of the 10th-century CE.

== Geography ==
Vanthali is situated nice miles to the west of the district headquarters Junagadh.

== Demographics ==
As of 2001 India census, Vanthali had a population of 21,891. Males constitute 53% of the population and females 47%. Vanthali has an average literacy rate of 70%, higher than the national average of 59.5%: male literacy is 77%, and female literacy is 61%.

== Places of interest ==
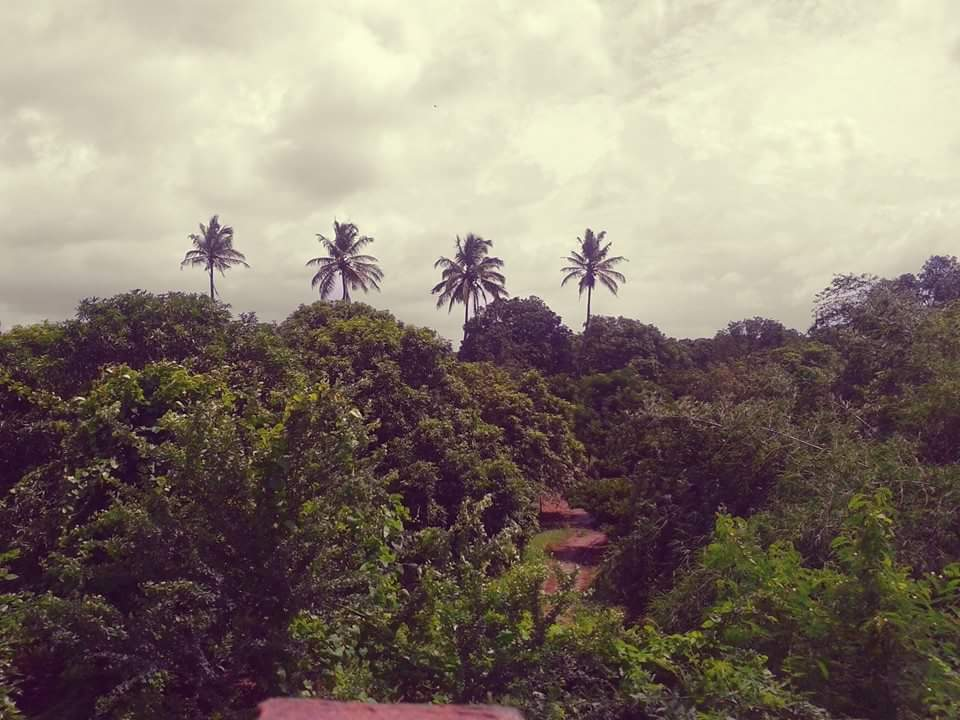
Coconut trees near Vanthali, Gujarat

Ra Khengar stepwell is a 13th-century stepwell located near Koyliphatak village near Vanthali. It is constructed in the Ghatapallava style. It had pillars surrounding it and possibly had three cupolas near it.
