= Chudasama dynasty =

Medieval dynasty in Gujarat, India

- c. 10th century–1472
- Capital: Vamanasthali; Junagadh
- Religion: Hinduism
- Government: Monarchy
  - c. 9th century: Chudachandra
  - c. 10th century: Graharipu
  - late 11th century: Navaghana
  - early 12th century: Khengara
  - 1294–1306: Mandalika I
  - 1451–1472: Mandalika III
- History
  - Established: c. 10th century
  - Conquest by Gujarat Sultanate: 1467–1472
  - Siege of Girnar: 4 December 1472
Preceded by	Succeeded by
Chavda dynasty	Vaghela dynasty; Gujarat Sultanate

The Chudasama dynasty ruled parts of the present-day Saurashtra region of Gujarat state in India between the 9th and 15th centuries. Their capital was based in Junagadh and Vamanasthali.

The early history of the Chudasama dynasty is almost lost. The bardic legends differ very much in names, order and numbers and so are not considered reliable. Traditionally, the dynasty is said to have been founded in the late 9th century by Chudachandra. Subsequent rulers such as Graharipu, Navaghana and Khengara were in conflict with Chaulukya rulers Mularaja and Jayasimha Siddharaja. Thus they are mentioned in contemporary and later Jain chronicles. After the end of Chaulukya rule and that of their successor Vaghela dynasty, the Chudasamas continued to rule independently or as vassals of the successor states, the Delhi Sultanate and Gujarat Sultanate. The first known Chudasama ruler recorded in inscriptions was Mandalika I, during whose reign Gujarat was invaded by the Khalji dynasty of Delhi. The last king of the dynasty, Mandalika III, was defeated and forcibly converted to Islam in 1472 by Sultan Mahmud Begada, who also annexed the state.

== Origin ==
The Chudasamas are variously considered to be an offshoot of the Sammas of Sindh or of Abhira origin.

Several inscriptions link the Chudasamas to the legendary lunar dynasty (or Chandravansh); later inscriptions and the text Mandalika-Nripa-Charita link them to the Yadava family of the Hindu deity Krishna. For example, the inscriptions at Neminath Temple (c. VS 1510/c. 1454 CE) on Girnar describes them as being of Yadava origin.

According to a legend, the father of Ra Chuda (that is, Chudachandra) was a Samma chief of Sindh; his mother was the sister of Wala Ram (c. 875), the last of chiefs of Vamansthali (modern Vanthali), who had earlier served as governors under the king of Vallabhi. Nainsi ri Khyat (17th century) also states that the Chudasamas migrated to Saurashtra from Sindh. The Chudasamas were described as being associated with Abhiras and as having close links with the Jadejas chieftains of Kutch, who claimed Rajput descent.

== History ==
Location of the Chudsamas, and neighbouring in South Asia, circa 800 CE.

The Chudasama dynasty were in constant conflict with the Chaulukyas. Hemachandra states that Mularaja of the Chaulukya dynasty fought against Graharipu, the ruler of Junagadh, to protect the pilgrims going to Prabhas Patan.

There are no known inscriptions of the period before Mandalika I. Still, it is certain that they had established their rule in the Saurashtra region before Mularaja came to power in Anahilavada because literary sources tell of battles between Chudasama kings and Chaulukya kings; Mularaja and Jayasimha Siddharaja. A Vanthali inscription records Mandalika, a king whose kingdom was captured by Jagatsimha, a feudatory of Chaulukya king Viradhavala. This Mandalika king must be another Mandalika mentioned in the latter half of the genealogy. As Viradhavala is known to have lived in VS 1288, he must be assigned the same date. As another Vanthali inscription date VS 1346, it must have been under the Jagatsimha's family till then. It seems that a later Chudasama king Mandalika regained Vanthali when Chaulukya rule weakened. So the later genealogy starts from him in later inscriptions. The Chudasamas continued to rule till VS 1527 (1472 CE) when they were defeated by Sultan Mahmud Begada. As inscriptions says about their resistance to Gujarat Sultans, it can be said that they were the most powerful dynasty in Saurashtra region at that time.

=== Coins ===
Based on historical records, it is known that the coins known as kodis, karshapan or pan, vishopak, dram and rupak were used in Chudasama domains. Eighty kodis were equal to one karshapan and sixteen karshapan were equal to one dram. One dram was equal to twenty vishopak.

=== Constructions ===
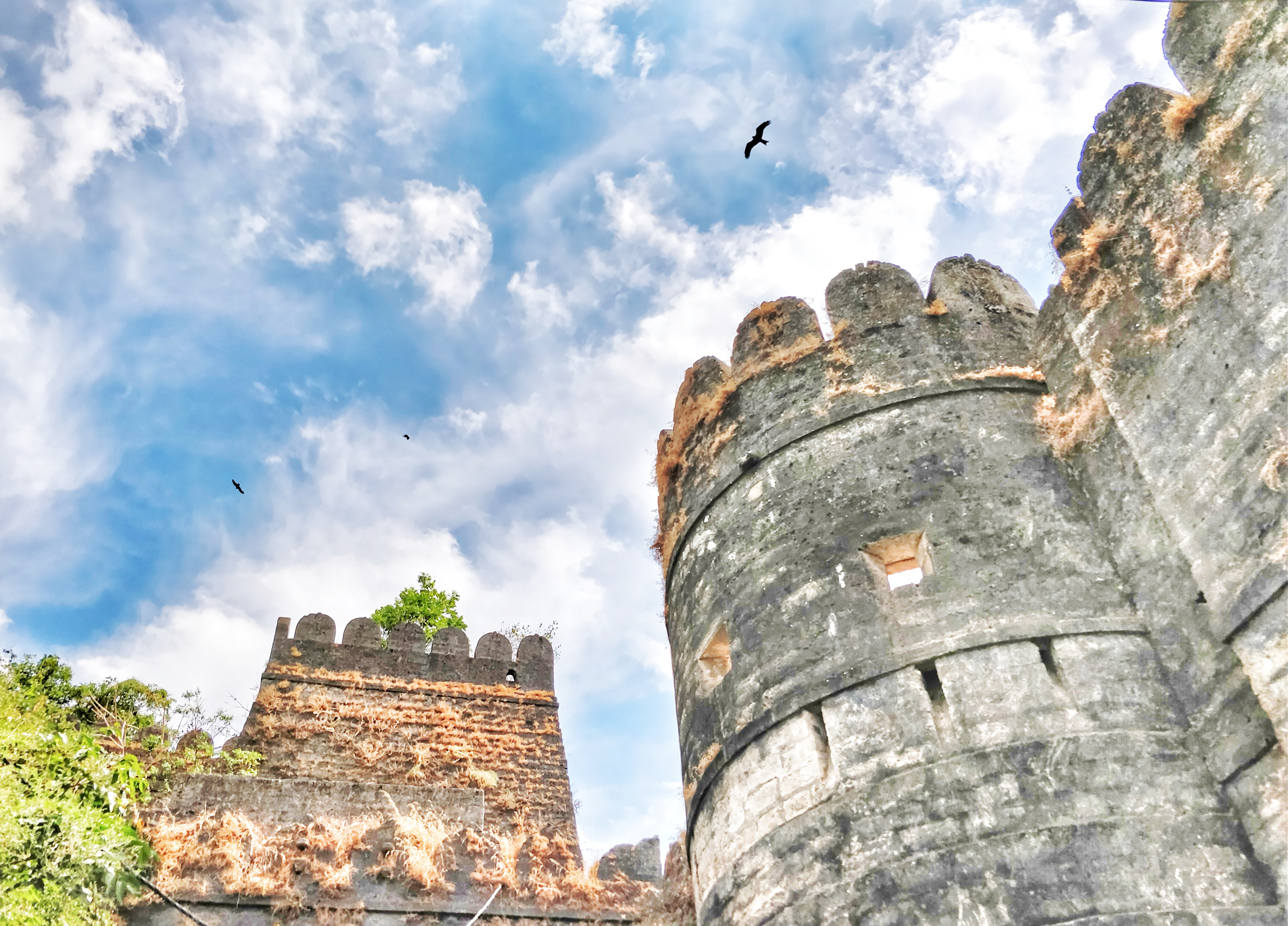
Uparkot Fort rediscovered by Chudasama ruler Graharipu

The Uparkot Fort of Junagadh was occupied by Chudasamas during the reign of Graharipu. Later it is said to have been rebuilt by Navaghana who had transferred his capital from Vamanasthali to Junagadh. He is also attributed with the constructions of Navghan Kuvo and Adi Kadi Vav, a well and a stepwell respectively, in the fort. His descendant Khengara is attributed with a stepwell, Ra Khengar Vav, on the way to Vanthali from Junagadh though it was built by Tejapala, the minister in the Vaghela court.

== Bibliography ==
- Rajyaghor, S. B. (1975). Gujarat State Gazetteers: Junagadh District. Ahmedabad: Directorate of Government Print., Stationery and Publications, Gujarat State.
