= Junagadh =

- City
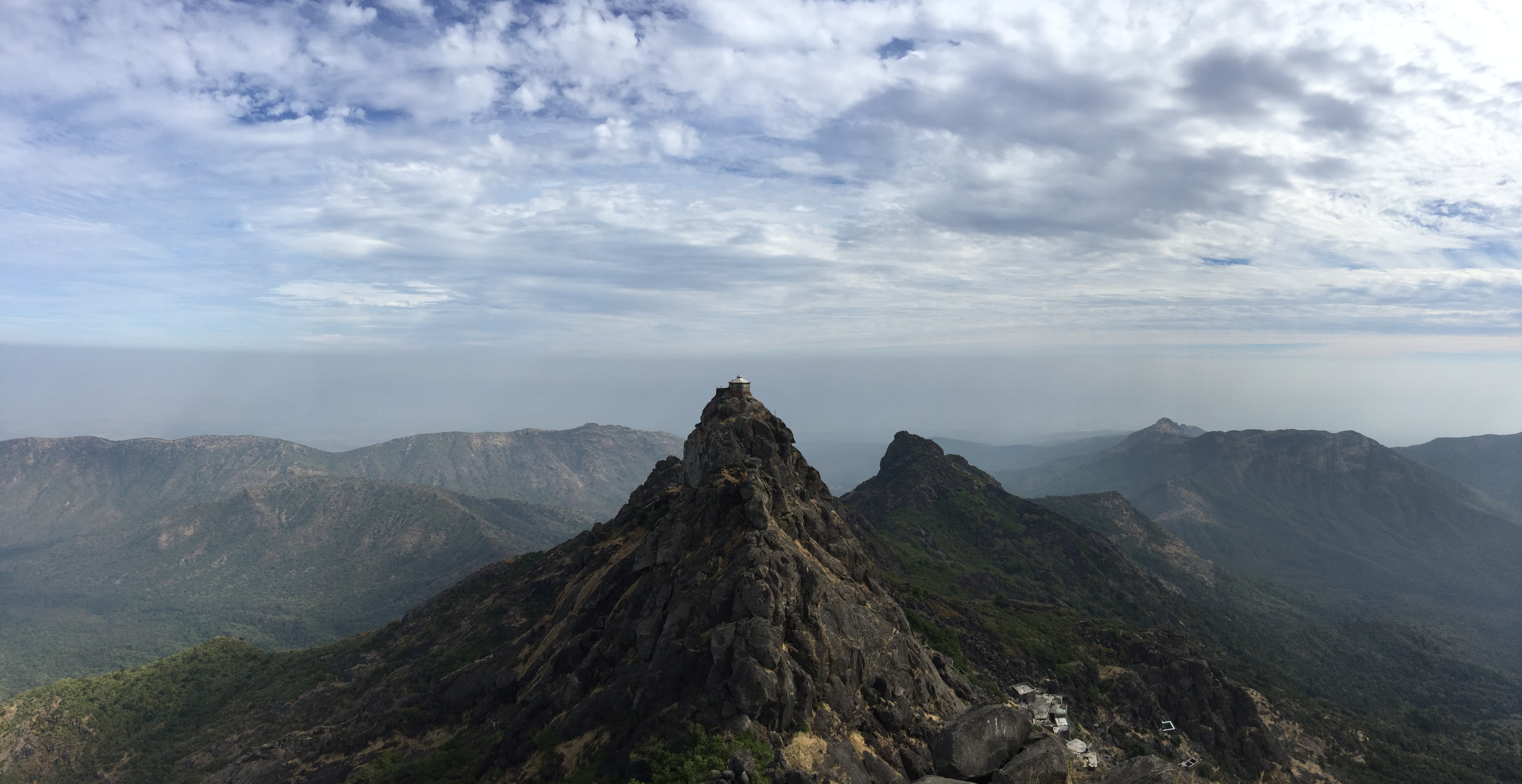
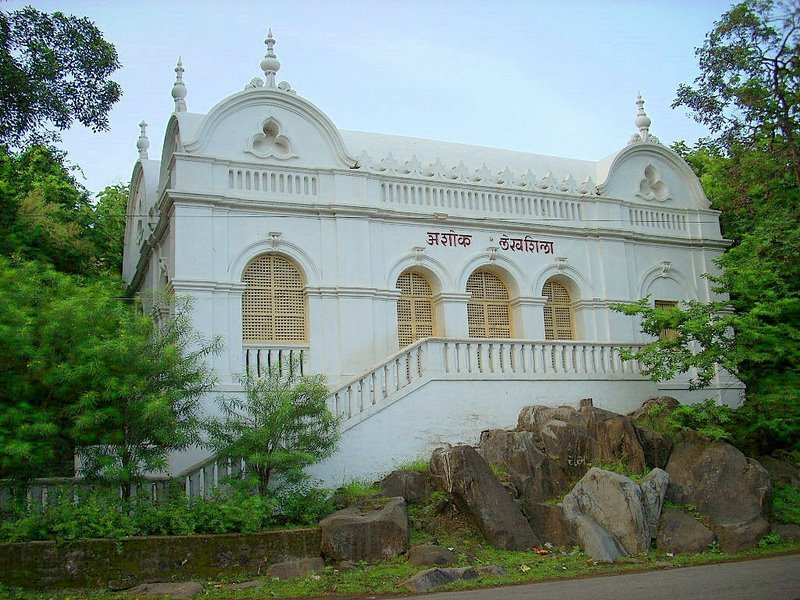
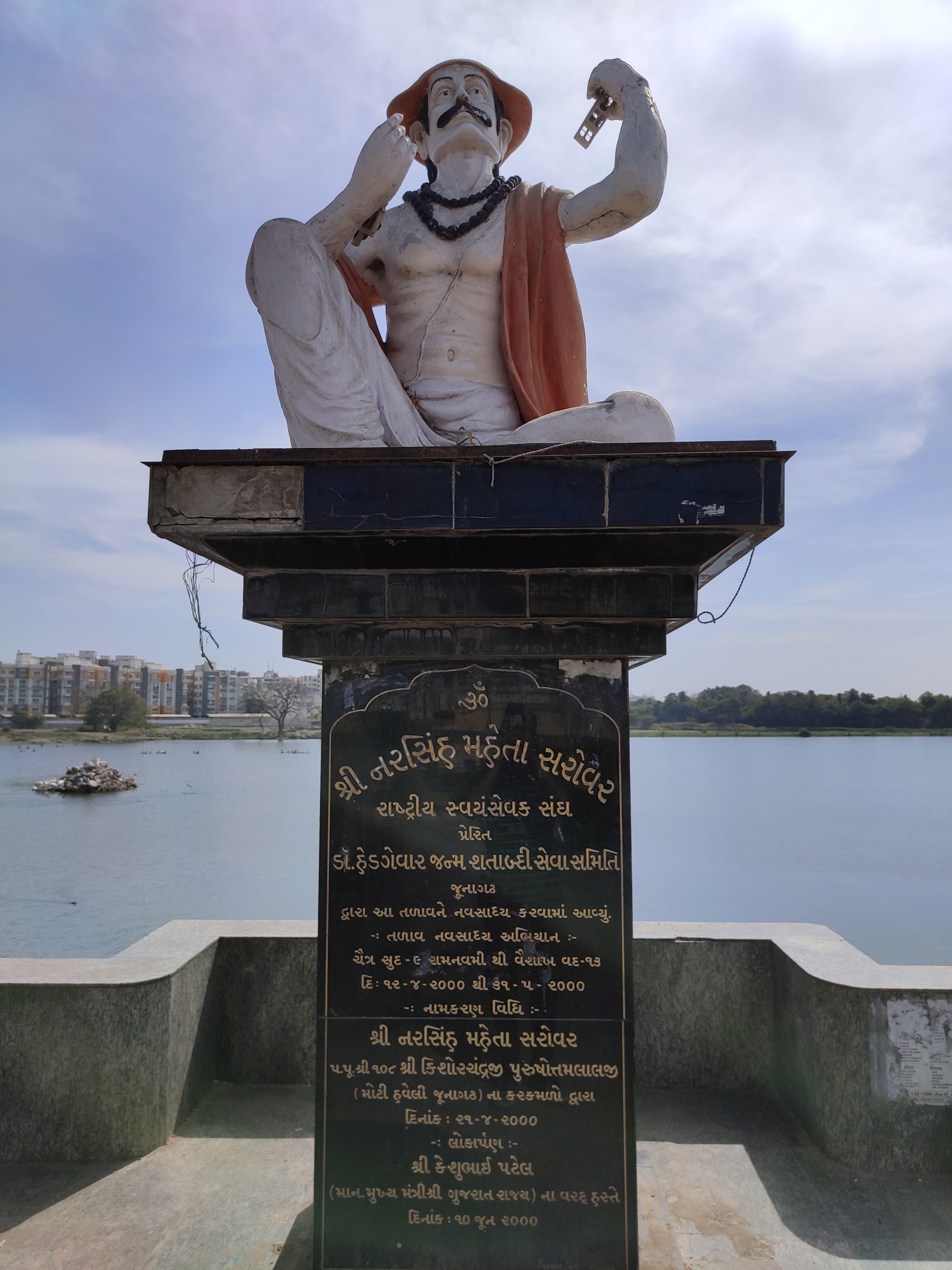
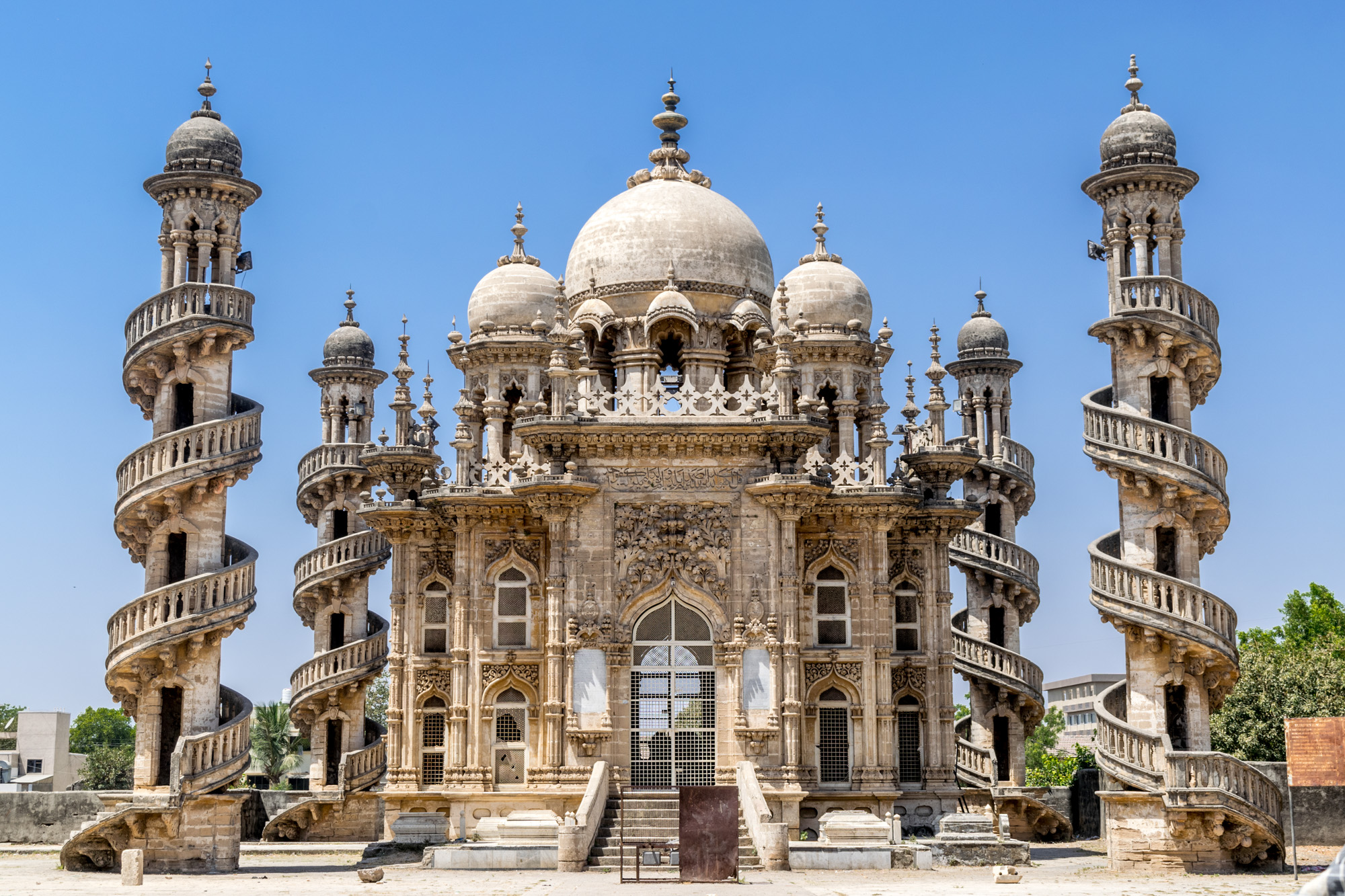
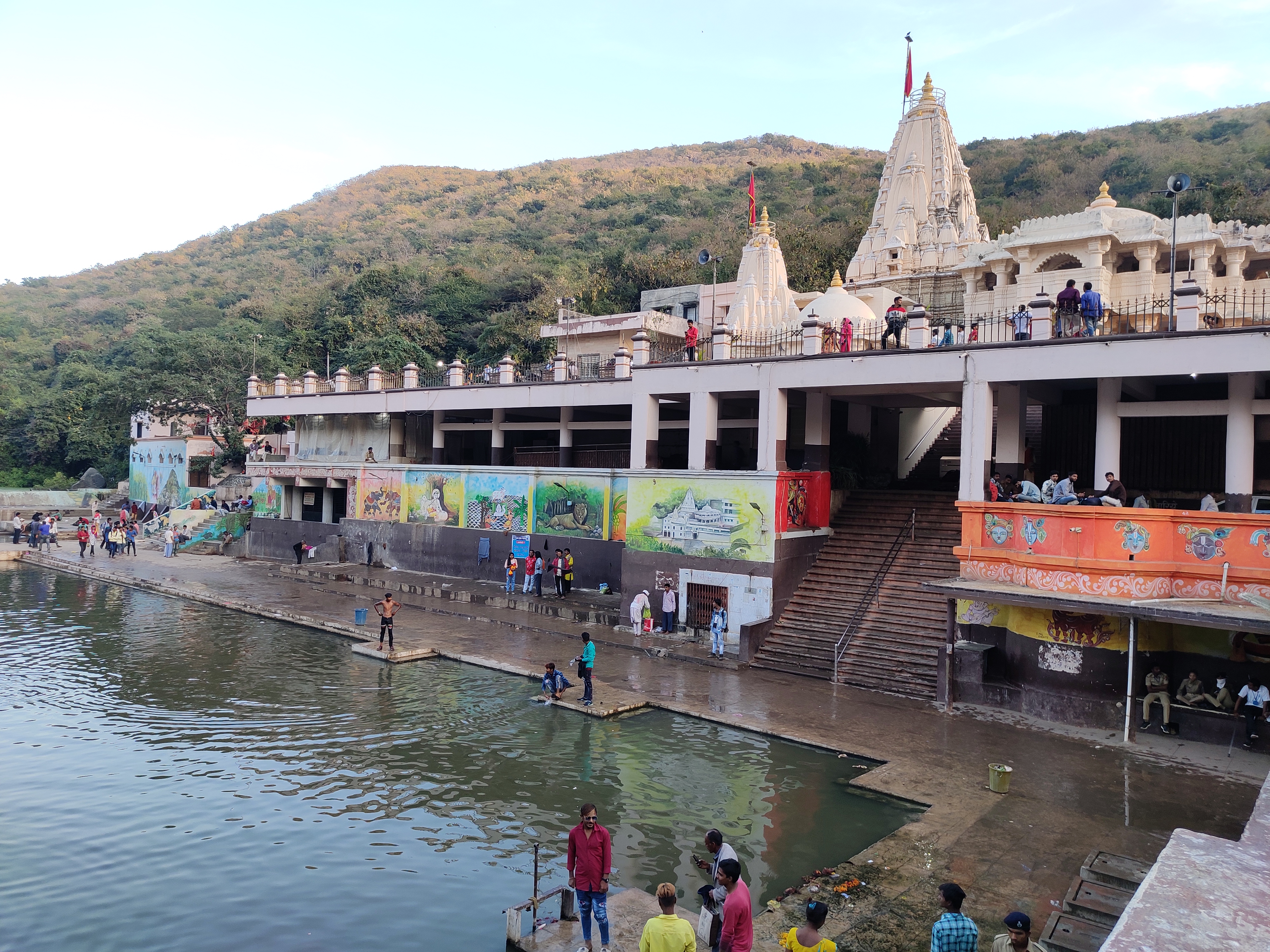
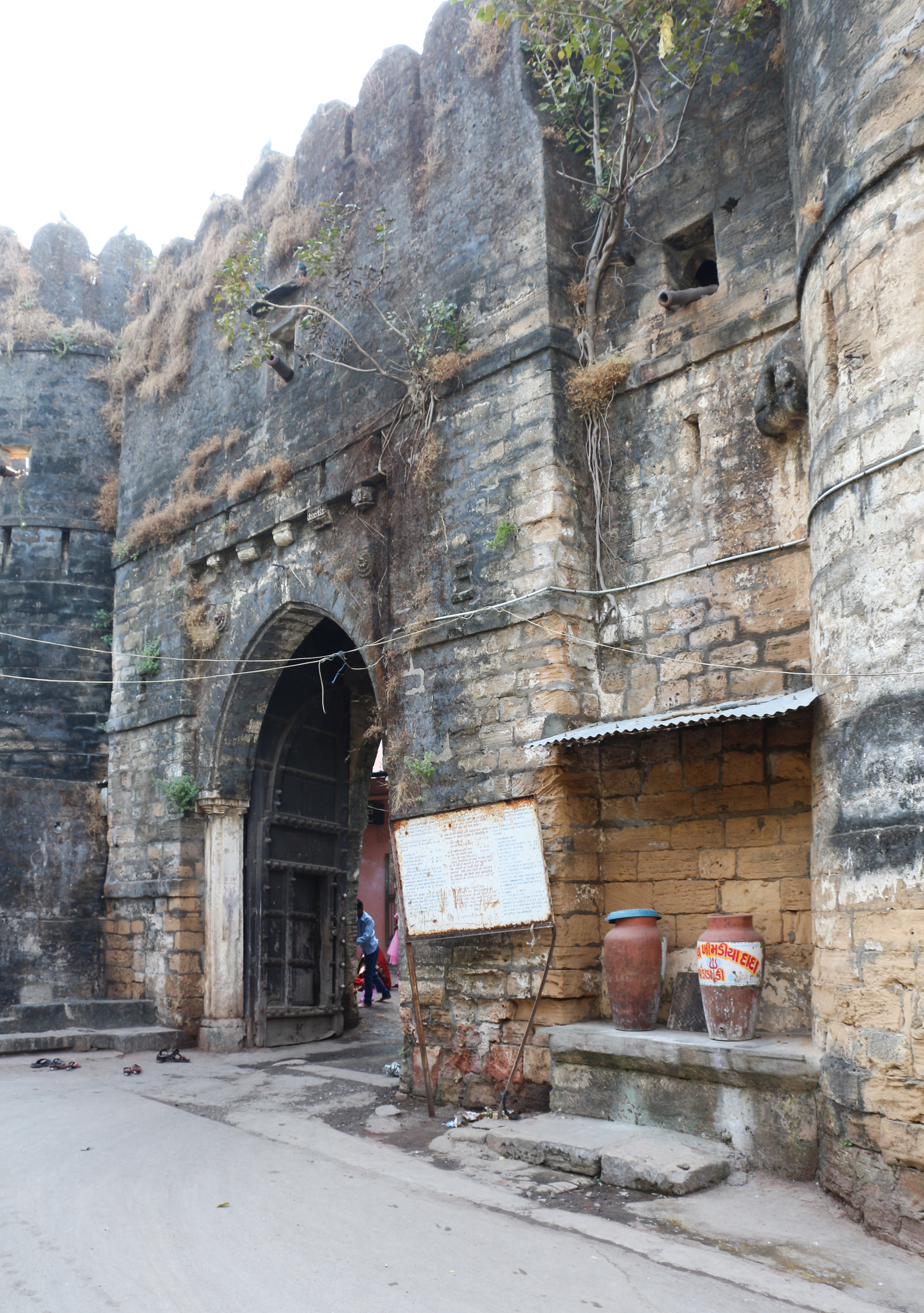
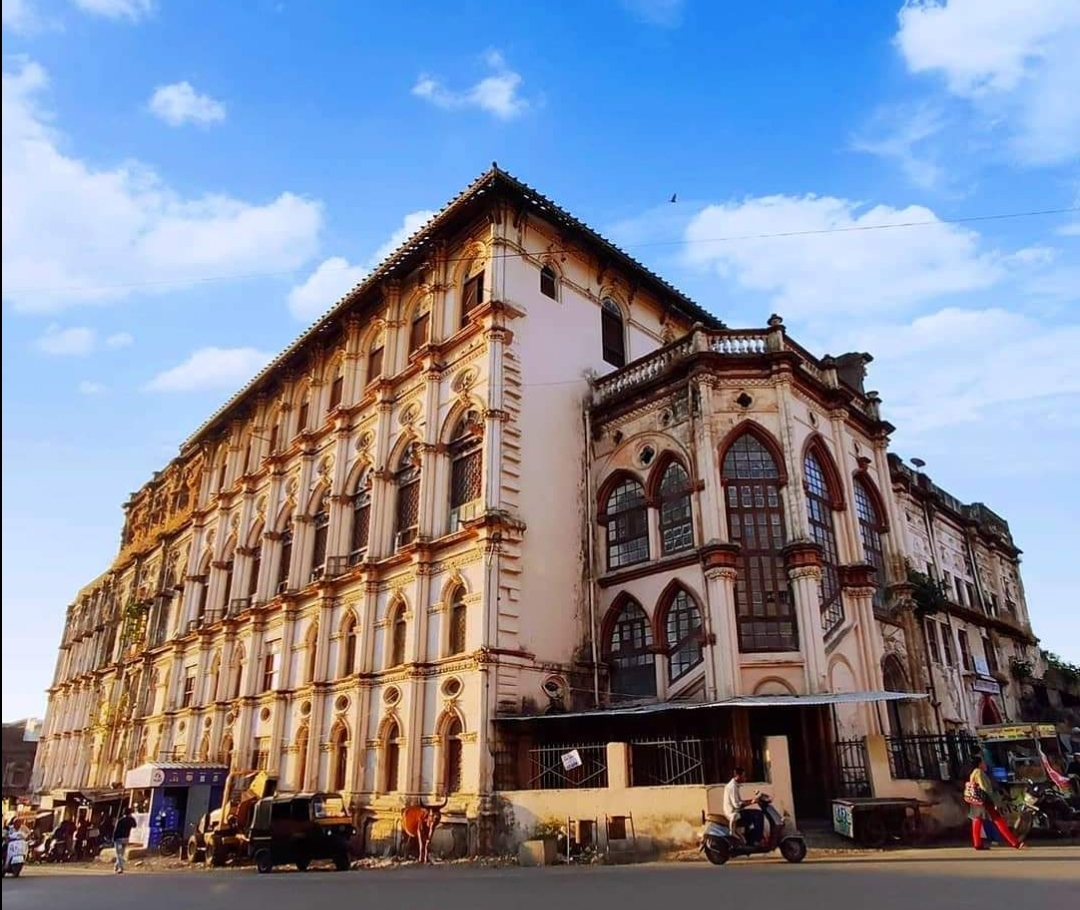
- Clockwise from top: Mount Girnar, Statue of Narsinh Mehta, Radha Damodar Temple & Damodar Kund, Junagadh Museum, Uparkot Fort, Mahabat Maqbara, Girnar Rock Edicts

- Junagadh (Gujarat) Junagadh (India)
- Coordinates: 21°31′19.9″N 70°27′28.4″E
- Country: India
- State: Gujarat
- Region: Saurashtra
- District: Junagadh
- Established: 319 BCE

Government
  - Type: Municipal Corporation
  - Body: Junagadh Municipal Corporation
  - Mayor: Geetaben Parmar (BJP)

Area
  - Total: 160 km^{2} (62 sq mi)
  - Rank: 7th
- Elevation: 102.27 m (335.5 ft)

Population (2025)
  - Total: 465,000
  - Rank: 137
  - Density: 2,900/km^{2} (7,500/sq mi)
- Demonym: Junagadhian

Languages
  - Official: Gujarati; Hindi
- Time zone: UTC+5:30 (IST)
- PIN: 36200x
- Telephone code: +91285xxxxxxx
- Vehicle registration: GJ-11
- Sex ratio: 1.04 ♂/♀
- Literacy rate: 88.00%
- Website: junagadhmunicipal.org

Junagadh is the city and headquarters of Junagadh district in the Indian state of Gujarat. Located at the foot of the Girnar hills, 355 kilometres (221 mi) southwest of Ahmedabad and Gandhinagar (the state capital), it is the seventh largest city in the state.

Literally translated, Junagadh means "Old Fort". It was a part of Saurashtra state and later Bombay state. In 1960, in consequence of the Maha Gujarat movement, it became part of the newly formed Gujarat state.

== Etymology ==
The name Junagadh is derived from the Sanskrit words jīrṇa (old) and garh (fort), meaning "old fort". The name refers to the ancient fortifications located at the foot of Mount Girnar. In historical records, the city has been referred to by names such as Girivraja and Ujjayanta, reflecting its antiquity and religious significance.

== History ==
=== Early history ===
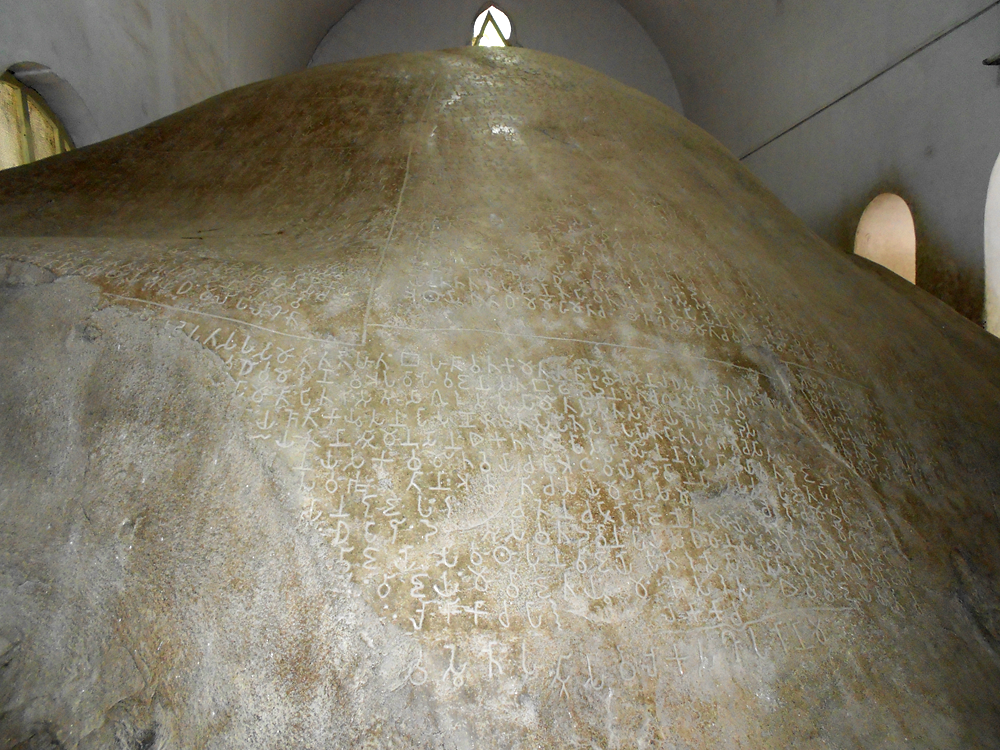
Ashoka's Rock Edict at Girnar, Junagadh

An early structure, Uparkot Fort, is located on a plateau in the middle of town. It was originally built in 319 BCE during the Mauryan dynasty by Chandragupta. The fort remained in use until the 6th century, after which it was abandoned for approximately 300 years. It was later rediscovered by the Chudasama ruler Graharipu in 976 CE. The fort was subsequently besieged 16 times over a 1000-year period. One unsuccessful siege lasted twelve years.

Within 2 kilometres (1.2 mi) of Uparkot Fort is an inscription with fourteen Edicts of Ashoka on a large boulder. The inscriptions are in Brahmi script in a language similar to Pali and date from 250 BCE. On the same rock there is a later inscription in Sanskrit, which was added around 150 CE by Mahakshatrap Rudradaman I, the Saka (Scythian) ruler of Malwa, and a member of the Western Kshatrapas dynasty, and which has been described as "the earliest known Sanskrit inscription of any extent". Another inscription dates from about 450 CE and refers to Skandagupta, the last Gupta emperor. Old rock-cut Buddhist caves in this area, dating from well before 500 CE, have stone carvings and floral work. There are also the Khapra Kodia Caves north of the fort, and the Bava Pyara Caves south of the fort. The Bava Pyara caves contain artworks of both Buddhism and Jainism.

The Maitraka dynasty ruled Gujarat from 475 to 767 CE. The founder of the dynasty, General Bhatarka, military governor of Saurashtra peninsula under the Gupta Empire, established himself as the independent ruler of Gujarat around the last quarter of the 5th century.

=== Chudasama dynasty ===
The early history of the Chudasama dynasty – which ruled Saurashtra from Junagadh – is almost lost. Bardic legends vary significantly in the names, order, and number of early rulers, making them unreliable as historical sources. According to tradition, the dynasty is said to have been founded in the late 9th century by Chudachandra. Subsequent rulers such as Graharipu, Navaghana, and Khengara, were in conflict with the Chaulukya rulers Mularaja and Jayasimha Siddharaja; and Saurashtra was briefly governed by Chaulukya governors during this period. These events are recorded in contemporary and later Jain chronicles.

In 1350, Junagadh was conquered by Muhammad bin Tughluq with the help and forces of Koli chieftain Jesaji (Jesing) from Ra Khengar.

After the end of the rule of the Chaulukyas and their successors, the Vaghela dynasty, in Gujarat, the Chudasamas ruled independently, or as vassals of successor states, the Delhi Sultanate and the Gujarat Sultanate. Mandalika I was the first Chudasama ruler known from inscriptions, and during his reign, Gujarat was invaded by the Khalji dynasty of Delhi. The last king of the dynasty, Mandalika III, was defeated and forcibly converted to Islam in 1472 by Gujarat Sultan Mahmud Begada, who annexed the state.

The Uparkot Fort of Junagadh was occupied by the Chudasamas during the reign of Graharipu. It is said to have been later rebuilt by Navaghana, who had transferred his capital from Vamanasthali to Junagadh. He is also credited with construction of the stepwells Navghan Kuvo and Adi Kadi Vav in the fort. His descendant Khengara is attributed with building a stepwell, Ra Khengar Vav, on the way to Vanthali from Junagadh.

=== Gujarat sultanate ===
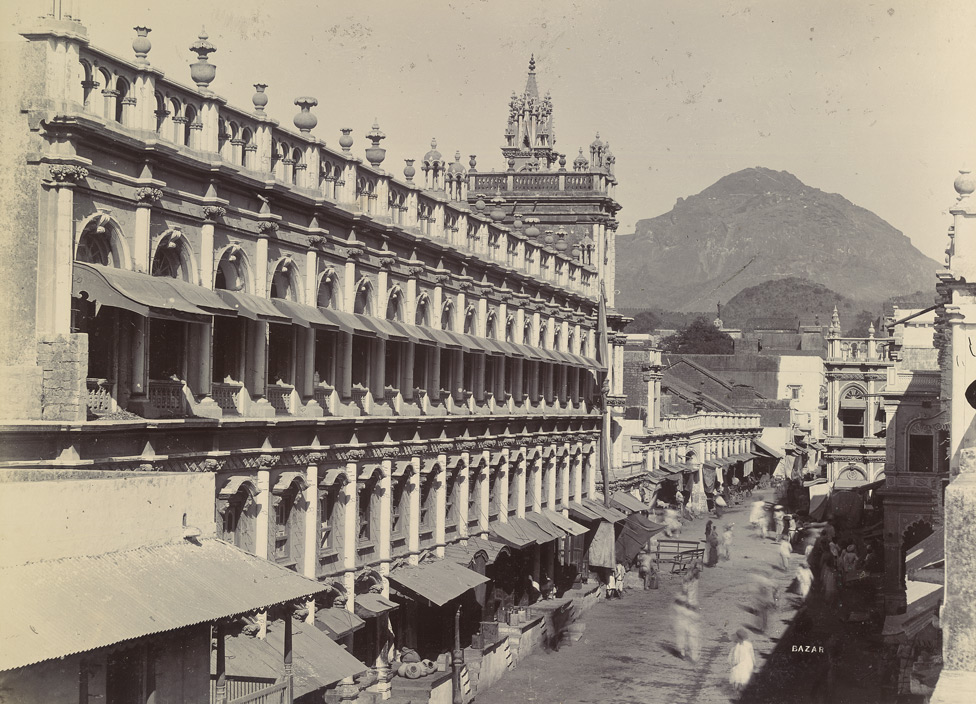
Photograph of a bazaar at Junagadh in Gujarat, taken by F. Nelson in the 1890s.

Sultan Mahmud Begada changed the name of Junagadh to Mustafabad and built the fortifications around the town and the mosque in Uparkot Fort.

Under the Gujarat Sultanate, Junagadh was governed by an official, styled thanadar (commander), appointed directly by Ahmedabad. This official collected the tribute and revenue of the crown domain. The first thanadar was Tatar Khan, an adopted son of the Sultan and after him Mirza Khalil, the eldest son of the Sultan who afterwards succeeded him under the title of Sultan Muzaffar. Prince Khalil during his tenure of office founded the village called Khalilpur. The Sultan also installed Bhupatsingh, the son of the last Chudasama king, Mandalika III, in Junagadh as a jagirdar (feudal lord). The jagir allotted to Bhupatsingh was the Sil Bagasra Chovisi; and his descendants were known as Raizada. They continued to rule there. Bhupatsingh was succeeded by his son Khengar.

After the accession of Sultan Muzafar, and indeed during the latter part of Sultan Mahmud's reign, the seat of government was moved from Junagadh to Diu owing to the importance of that island as a naval station and to check the ravages of the Portuguese. Tatarkhan Ghori was left at Junagadh by Malik Eiaz who himself resided at Diu. After the disgrace and death of Malik Eiaz, Tatarkhan Ghori became independent at Junagadh; and after the death of Sultan Bahadur, the Ghori family reigned independently at Junagadh, though still owing a nominal allegiance to the successive Sultans at Ahmadabad. This state of affairs continued until the first conquest of Gujarat by the Mughal emperor Akbar, when Aminkhan Ghori had succeeded his father Tatarkhan at Junagadh.

When the Portuguese took over the ports of Diu and Daman in the 16th century, a fifteen-foot cannon, made in Egypt in 1531, was abandoned by a Turkish admiral opposing the Portuguese forces at Diu, which is now at Uparkot Fort.

=== Under the Mughal Empire ===
Ghori rule

In 1525, Khengar was succeeded by his son Noghan. Tatarkhan Ghori had now become almost independent. In his time Jam Raval conquered Halar and built Navanagar. In 1551, Noghan was succeeded by his son Shrisingh, who lived till 1586. During this time, Tatarkhan Ghori died and was succeeded by his son Aminkhan Ghori. In his time, Akbar conquered Gujarat, although Sorath remained independent under the Ghori rule. The exact date of Tatarkhan Ghori's death is not known; but from the mention of Aminkhan as his successor, it must have been from about 1570 to 1575. On the return of Emperor Akbar to Agra in 1573, after the defeat and death of Muhammad Husain Mirzah and Ikhtiyar ul Mulk, he gave orders that Sorath should be conquered from Aminkhan Ghori. Vazir Khan attempted it but was unequal to the task. Great confusion existed now in Sorath. The Moghal conquest of Gujarat, the collapse of the power of the Gujarat Sultans, the encroachments of the Jam, and the assumption of independence by the Ghori all augmented the confusion afterwards increased by the escape of Sultan Muzaffar in 1583 and subsequent partisan warfare.

During these disturbances Amin Khan Ghori and his son Daulat Khan Ghori espoused the cause of Muzafar, as did the Jam and Loma Khuman of Kherdi. The exact date of Amin Khan Ghori's death is not known but it was about 1589–90. Raizada Khengar also warmly espoused Mnzafar's side. After the siege and capture of Junagadh in 1591–92 by Naurang Khan, Syad Kasim, and Gnjar Khan; Khengar was dismissed to his estate of Sil Bagasra, and the Raizada ceased to rule at Junagadh. Daulat Khan Ghori died of his wounds during the siege, and henceforth Junagadh became the seat of the imperial faujdars (garrison commanders) of Sorath in subordination to the imperial viceroy at Ahmedabad.

Imperial rule

The first faujdar of Junagad was Naurang Khan and, next, Syad Kasim. The most famous were (1) Mirzah Isa Tarkhan (2) Kutb ud din Kheshgi, and (3) Sardarkhan. Of these Mirzah Isa Tarkhan ruled Sorath from about 1633–34 to 1642, when he was appointed viceroy of Gujarat. On this occasion he left his son Inayat Ullah as faujdar at Junagadh while he himself conducted the government of Gujarat from its capital, Ahmedabad. In Mirzah Isa Tarkhan's time the fortifications of Junagadh were entirely repaired. Kutb ud din was another faujdar, and his tenure of office lasted from about 1653 to 1666. In about 1664, he conquered Navanagar and annexed it to the imperial domain. Sardarkhan also distinguished himself as faujdar of Sorath, both by the firmness of his rule and by his construction (1681, AH 1092) of the Sardar Baug (palace) and excavation of the Sardar Talav (main gate). He built a mausoleum for himself in the Sardar Baug, but he died at Thatta, in Sindh, and is said to have been buried there and not at Junagadh. He was faujdar from about 1666 to 1686, but in 1670 he went for a short time to Idar and was replaced by Syad Dilerkhan. The last of the faujdar s was Sherkhan Babi, who became independent and assumed the title of Nawab Bahadur Khan.

=== Junagadh state ===
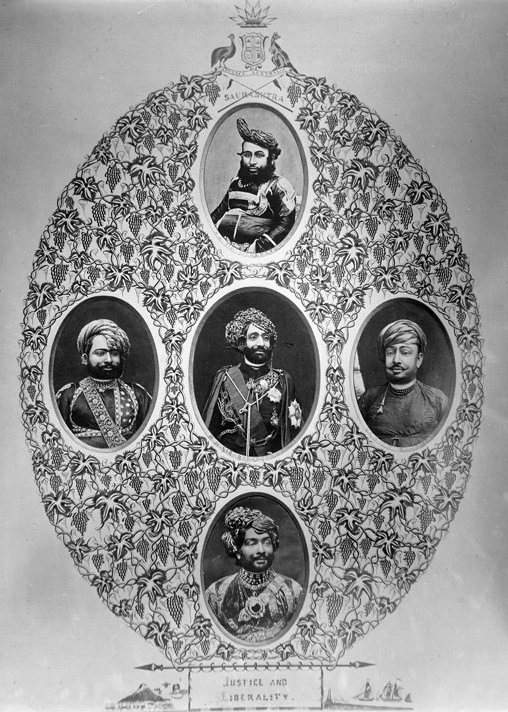
Junagadh Nawabs and state officials, 19th century.

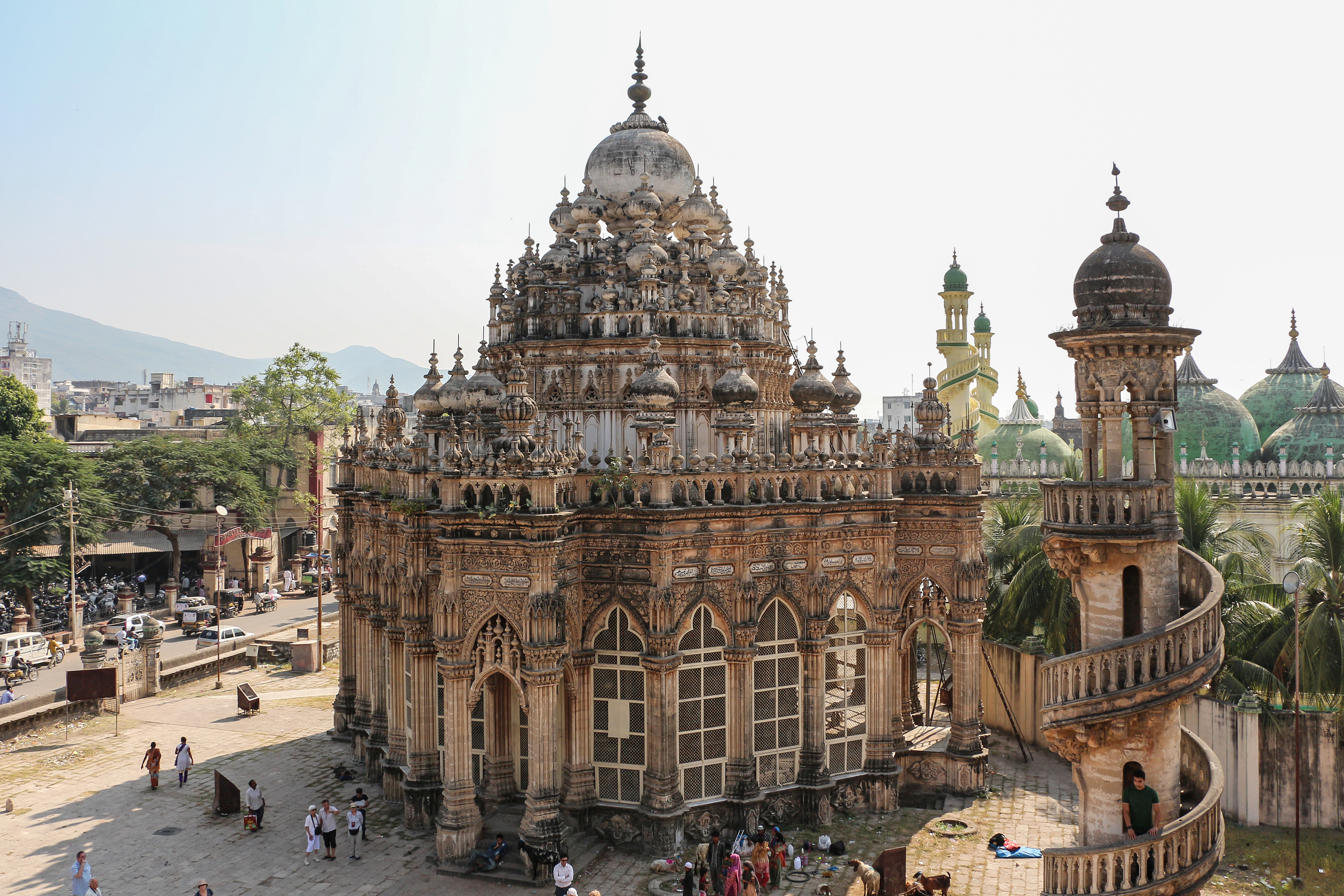
Tomb of Mahabat Khan

In 1730, Mohammad Sher Khan Babi, who owed allegiance to the Mughal governor of Gujarat Subah, founded the state of Junagadh by declaring independence after the invasion by the Maratha Gaekwad dynasty. Babi founded the Babi Dynasty of Junagadh State. His descendants, the Babi Nawabs of Junagadh—who were Babi or Babai pashtuns from Afghanistan—conquered large territories in southern Saurashtra and ruled for the next two centuries, first as tributaries of Marathas, and later under the suzerainty of the British, who granted the honor of a 13-gun salute.

- 1730–1758 – Mohammad Bahadur Khanji or Mohammad Sher khan Babi
- 1758–1774 – Mohammad Mahabat Khanji I
- 1774–1811 – Mohammad Hamid Khanji I
- 1811–1840 – Mohammad Bahadur Khanji II
- 1840–1851 – Mohammad Hamid Khanji II
- 1851–1882 – Mohammad Mahabat Khanji II
- 1882–1892 – Mohammad Bahadur Khanji III
- 1892–1911 – Mohammad Rasul Khanji
- 1911–1948 – Mohammad Mahabat Khanji III

==== British period ====
Flag of Junagadh, during the British period.

In 1807, Junagadh State became a British protectorate. The East India Company took control of the state by 1818, but the Saurashtra area was never directly administered by the British, who instead divided the territory into more than one hundred princely states, which remained in existence until 1947. The present old-town, developed during the 19th and 20th centuries, constituted one of those princely states.

The Shri Swaminarayan Mandir temple in Junagadh was constructed on land presented by Jinabhai (Hemantsingh) Darbar of Panchala, and dedicated on 1 May 1828. Swaminarayan appointed Gunatitanand Swami as the first mahant (religious and administrative head of a temple), who served in this role and preached there for over 40 years.

==== Annexation by India ====
During the period just before the independence and partition of India and Pakistan in 1947, the 562 princely states that had existed outside British India, but under British suzerainty, were given the choice of acceding to either India or Pakistan. Although the states were theoretically free to choose, Earl Mountbatten stated that "geographic compulsions" meant that most of them would choose India. Mountbatten took the position that only states that shared a common border with Pakistan should choose to accede to it, but he had no power to impose this point of view on the states.

On 15 September 1947, Nawab Mohammad Mahabat Khanji III of Junagadh – which, although located at the south-western end of Gujarat, had no common border with Pakistan – chose to accede to Pakistan, ignoring Mountbatten's views and arguing that Junagadh could access Pakistan by sea. The rulers of two states that were subject to the suzerainty of Junagadh — Mangrol and Babariawad — reacted by declaring their independence from Junagadh and acceding to India. In response, the nawab's forces militarily occupied the two states. Rulers of other neighbouring states reacted angrily, sent troops to the Junagadh frontier, and appealed to the government of India for assistance. A group of Junagadhis, led by Samaldas Gandhi, formed a government-in-exile, the Aarzi Hukumat ("temporary government").

India asserted that Junagadh was not contiguous to Pakistan and, believing that if Junagadh was permitted to accede to Pakistan communal tension already simmering in Gujarat would worsen, refused to accept the nawab's accession to Pakistan. The Indian government pointed out that the state was 96% Hindu, and called for a plebiscite to decide the question of accession. India cut off supplies of fuel and coal to Junagadh, severed air and postal links, sent troops to the frontier, and occupied the principalities of Mangrol and Babariawad, which had acceded to India.

Pakistan agreed to discuss a plebiscite, subject to the withdrawal of Indian troops, a condition India rejected. On 26 October, the nawab and his family fled to Pakistan following clashes between Junagadhi and Indian troops.

On 7 November, Junagadh's court, facing collapse, invited the government of India to take over the state's administration. The Dewan of Junagadh, Sir Shah Nawaz Bhutto, the father of Zulfiqar Ali Bhutto, decided to invite the Government of India to intervene and wrote a letter to Mr. Buch, the regional commissioner of Saurashtra in the government of India to this effect.

The government of India rejected the protests of Pakistan and accepted the invitation of the dewan to intervene. A plebiscite was conducted in February 1948, but it was not internationally monitored. Pakistan's claims were based on the logic of the Kashmir annexation, and not on the plebiscite, which went almost unanimously in favour of accession to India. Junagadh became a part of the Indian state of Saurashtra until 1 November 1956, when Saurashtra became part of Bombay state. In 1960, Bombay state was split into the linguistic states of Maharashtra and Gujarat, in which Junagadh was located.

In 2020, Pakistan's government has maintained and revived its territorial claim on Junagadh, along with Manavadar and Sir Creek in Gujarat, on its official political map.

=== Timelines ===
==== Ruling dynasties ====
Various Rulers	Time Period
Maurya Dynasty ruled over Junagadh	in 319 BC
Kalinga Dynasty ruled over Junagadh	in 185 BC
Greeks ruled over Junagadh	in 73–70 BC
Shaka (Scythians) ruled over Junagadh	100–275 AD
Kshatrapa ruled over Junagadh	276–455 AD
Gupta ruled over Junagadh	456–770 AD
The Chinese Traveller Hu-en-Tsang visited Junagadh	640 AD
Chudasama ruled over Junagadh	875–1472 AD
Turkic Rulers Mohammed Begada, Khalil Khan	1472–1572 AD
Mughals ruled over Junagadh	1573–1730 AD
Nawabs of Junagadh Khanji (Babi Pathan) ruled over	1730–1949

==== Post-partition history ====
- 15 Aug 1947 – Independence, Instrument of Accession to Pakistan signed
- 13 Sep 1947 – Accession to Pakistan accepted
- 25 Sep 1947 – Provisional government formed
- 7 Nov 1947 – India invited to take over administration
- 9 Nov 1947 – Occupied by India
- 10 Nov 1947 – Rescinds accession to Pakistan, accedes to India.
- 24 Feb 1948 – Plebiscite held
- 25 Feb 1948 – Annexation by India

== Geography ==
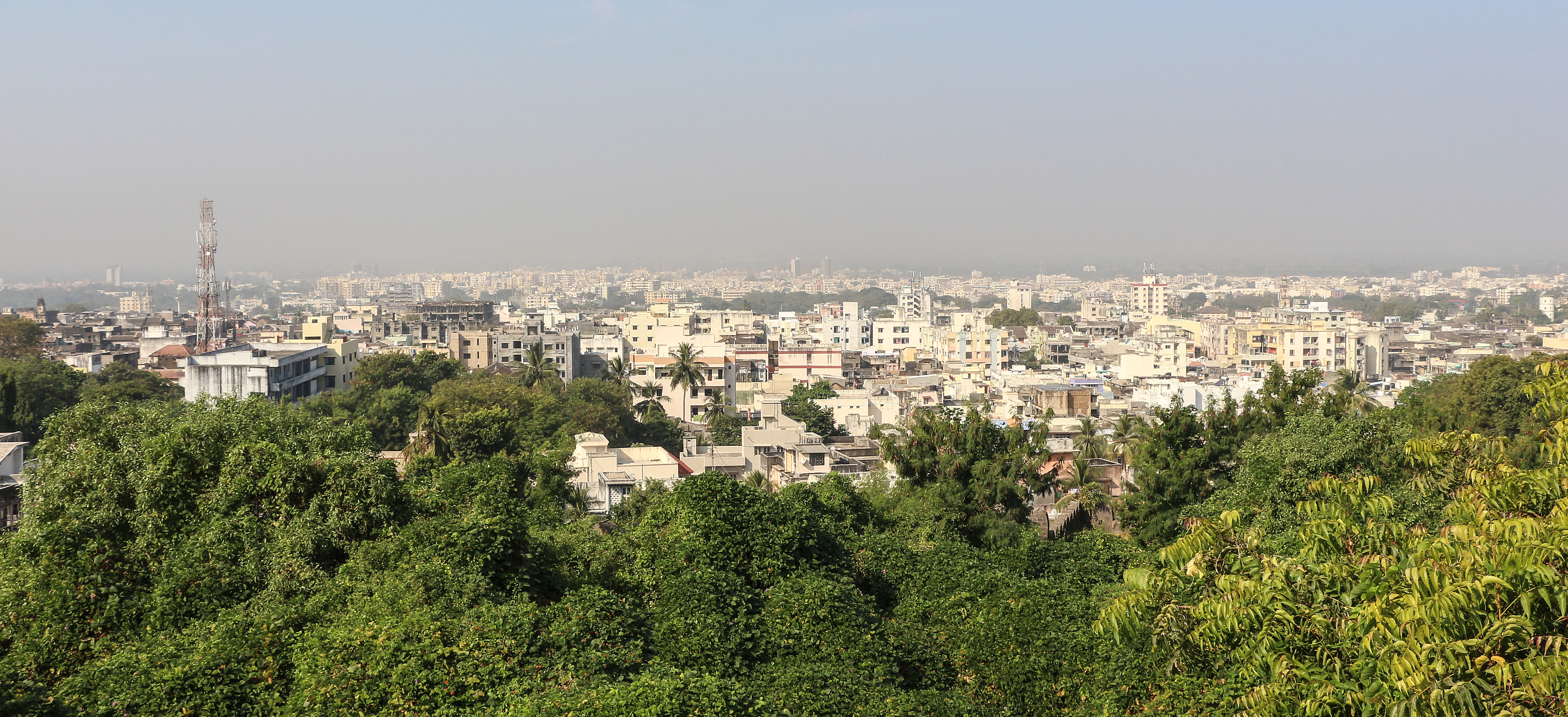
View of Junagadh

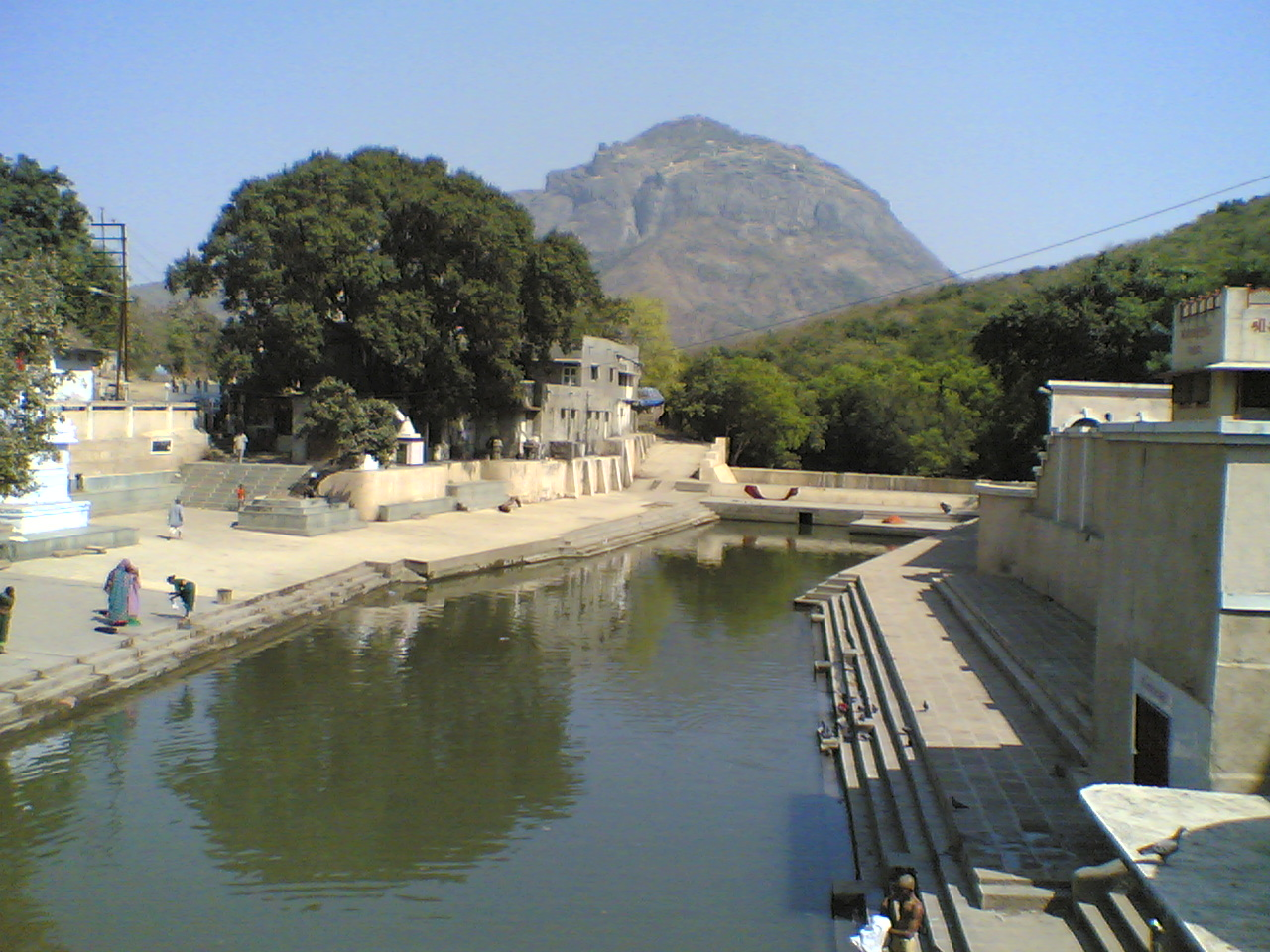
View of Girnar Hills from Damodar Kund.

Junagadh city is located at 21.52°N 70.47°E at the foot of Mount Girnar, with the Arabian sea to the southwest, Rajkot to the north, and Amreli to the east. It has an average elevation of 107 metres (351 ft).

Junagadh city has two rivers, the Sonrakh and the Kalwo, which is polluted from city sewers. The city has several lakes: Narsinh Mehta Sarovar, Damodarji, Sudarshan Lake, etc. Willingdon Dam, Hasnapur Dam, and Anandpur Weir are the main water sources for the city. Groundwater supply is widely available in the city, with wells throughout.

Junagadh's soil is similar to that of the rest of Junagadh district. It is deep- to medium-black coastal alluvium, due to its proximity to the sea, long shoreline, and nearby mountain ridge. Because of many fault lines in the vicinity, Junagadh is in a seismically active zone. Junagadh lies in a Seismic Zone III region, which means earthquakes up to magnitude 6.5 on the Richter-scale may be expected.

=== Climate ===
Junagadh has a tropical wet and dry climate (Köppen Aw), with two distinct seasons: a dry season from October to May, and a wet season from June to September. The close proximity of the Arabian Sea and the Gulf of Cambay affect the climate. In the summer months, temperatures range from 28 to 38 °C (82.4 to 100.4 °F). In the winter, they range from 10 to 25 °C (50 to 77 °F). From June to September the city is affected by the Southwest monsoon. Rainfall averages 800 to 1,200 millimetres (31 to 47 in) annually. The greatest annual rainfall of 2,790 millimetres (110 in) was recorded in 1983, and the lowest total of 146 millimetres (5.7 in) in 1987.

Climate data for Junagadh
Month	Jan	Feb	Mar	Apr	May	Jun	Jul	Aug	Sep	Oct	Nov	Dec	Year
Mean daily maximum °C (°F)	27.2 (81.0)	28.3 (82.9)	31.4 (88.5)	32.7 (90.9)	33.4 (92.1)	32.9 (91.2)	30 (86)	29.3 (84.7)	30.1 (86.2)	32.5 (90.5)	31.6 (88.9)	28.7 (83.7)	30.7 (87.2)
Mean daily minimum °C (°F)	13.1 (55.6)	14.7 (58.5)	18.1 (64.6)	21.6 (70.9)	25.2 (77.4)	26.5 (79.7)	25.7 (78.3)	24.7 (76.5)	23.9 (75.0)	21.9 (71.4)	18.3 (64.9)	14.9 (58.8)	20.7 (69.3)
Average precipitation mm (inches)	0 (0)	0 (0)	2 (0.1)	1 (0.0)	33 (1.3)	118 (4.6)	372 (14.6)	291 (11.5)	116 (4.6)	19 (0.7)	5 (0.2)	1 (0.0)	958 (37.6)
Source: Climate-Data.org

== Demographics ==
As of the 2011 census, Junagadh municipality had a population of 319,462. The municipality had a sex ratio of 955 females per 1,000 males and 9% of the population were under six years old. The effective literacy rate was 88%; male literacy was 92.46% and female literacy was 83.38%.

Junagadh has relatively low to medium housing and land costs in comparison to cities like Rajkot. The city is rapidly expanding, and available land inside the city limits is now limited. Total area under slums is 19.5 square kilometres (7.5 sq mi) (14.5% of the total municipal area) and the total slum population accounts for around 25% of the total population.

Religions in Junagadh
Religion	Percent
Hinduism	82.31%
Islam	16.46%
Jainism	0.67%
Others	0.56%
Others include Christianity, Sikhism, Zoroastianism and Buddhism

The religions represented in Junagadh includes Hindus, Muslims, Jains, Christians, and Buddhists. Among these Hindus are the majority and Muslims are the largest minority group. Jains and Christians are present in considerable numbers. Sikhs and Parsis are very few in number. There are Tibetan migrants who practice Buddhism. The main language group is Gujarati. Others are Hindi and Sindhi. A small community of African origin, known as "Siddis", resides in and around the Gir Sanctuary, but some of them have moved to the city. There are around 8816 Siddi in the state and 65% of them reside in Junagadh. Swaminarayan Hinduism is also widely followed in the city. There are two Swaminarayan temples in the city: the old temple is managed by the Vadtal diocese and the new temple is managed by Bochasanwasi Shri Akshar Purushottam Swaminarayan Sanstha.

== Administration ==
The city is divided into the main city, which is centered on Mahatma Gandhi (M.G.) Road and Kalwa Chowk; Gandhigram; Zanzarda Road; Talaw Darwaza; the bus stand; Sakkar Baug; Timbawadi; Joshipara; and Girnar Taleti. The city is administered by the Junagadh Municipal Corporation.

The politics of Junagadh city has always been closely contested between the Indian National Congress (INC) and the Bharatiya Janta Party (BJP). Other national parties are the Bahujan Samaj Party (BSP), the Communist Party of India, and the Nationalist Congress Party. Regional parties active in Junagadh are the Mahagujarat Janta Party, the Samata Party, and the Republic Party of India. Junagadh has 194,196 registered voters, of which 100,050 are male and 94,146 female.

Junagadh has one state-assembly constituency. The BJP won this seat in the 2007 election, with 52.36% of the 118,888 votes cast, with the next largest vote being 26.32% for the INC candidate. Election for the state assembly is held every 5 years.

== Junagadh Municipal Corporation ==
The Junagadh Municipal Corporation (JuMC) has 17 wards and total of 51 seats. In the 2009 municipal elections the INC won 26 seats, BJP 21 seats, BSP 3 seats and 1 went to an independent. While the majority of the seats went to the INC, the BJP candidates received more votes: 134,739, or 45.62% of the total, the INC receiving 120,533, 40.81%. The Mayor, Deputy Mayor has terms of 2 and a half years.

== Utilities ==
Junagadh's population of 452000 requires 30 million litres (6,600,000 imp gal; 7,900,000 US gal) of water per day, which is supplied through 25,000 tap connections to three major surface water sources, namely Aanandpur Weir, Hasanapur Dam, and Wellingdon Dam, as well as to 32 wells. Junagadh has more than 1000 hand pumps and 200 stand posts situated throughout the city drawing from groundwater sources.

In January 2004, Junagadh city increased its area from 13.47 square kilometres (5.20 sq mi) to 57 square kilometres (22 sq mi) by annexing eight grampanchayats and one municipality. The newly acquired area has its own groundwater supply system of bore wells.

The city generates approximately 150 tonnes (150 long tons; 170 short tons) of solid waste daily, which is within the recommended limit, of 400 grams (14 oz) per capita, per day, for domestic waste. The waste is collected by deploying 400 wheel barrows (six containers) as per supreme court guidelines and Municipal Solid Wastes (MSW) rule 2000. The municipal council has set up 800 community bins for solid waste collection. It covers 90% of city area. Junagadh's drainage system is 62 kilometres (39 mi) long but it serves only 67% of the total area and 60% of the population.

The Paschim Gujarat Vij Company Ltd. (P.G.V.C.L.), a state-run electricity company, provides electric power. Telecom service is provided mainly by Bharat Sanchar Nigam Limited (B.S.N.L.); other service providers include Reliance and Tata. Cell-phone coverage is extensive and the main service providers are Vodafone, B.S.N.L., Airtel, Idea, and Tata Docomo. B.S.N.L. also provides broadband service.

The city has a good network of street lights. There is a total of 12,545 tube lights and 1523 central sodium street lights. A Solar power project has been approved for Narsinh Mehta Sarovar.

== Transportation ==
Junagadh is connected by a network of road and rail links that serve both local and long-distance travel.

=== Road ===
Junagadh lies on National Highway 8D (NH 8D), which connects the city with regional centres such as Rajkot and Veraval. The Junagadh City Bypass on NH 8D allows through-traffic to avoid the city centre, and local roads link Junagadh to nearby towns and tourist destinations including Mount Girnar.

=== Rail ===
The city is served by Junagadh Junction railway station, which is part of the Western Railway zone of Indian Railways on the Rajkot–Somnath line. The station has multiple platforms and handles passenger and express services connecting Junagadh with Rajkot, Ahmedabad, Veraval and other destinations.

=== Air ===
Junagadh does not have a major commercial airport within the city limits. The nearest major airport with regular scheduled services is Rajkot Airport, located approximately 100 km from Junagadh. Regional air services are also available at Keshod Airport in Junagadh district, which has limited connectivity.

=== Local transport ===
Within the city, rickshaws and auto-rickshaws are common modes of urban transportation. Additionally, the Girnar ropeway provides aerial access between Bhavnath Taleti and parts of Mount Girnar, serving both tourists and pilgrims.

== Ropeway ==
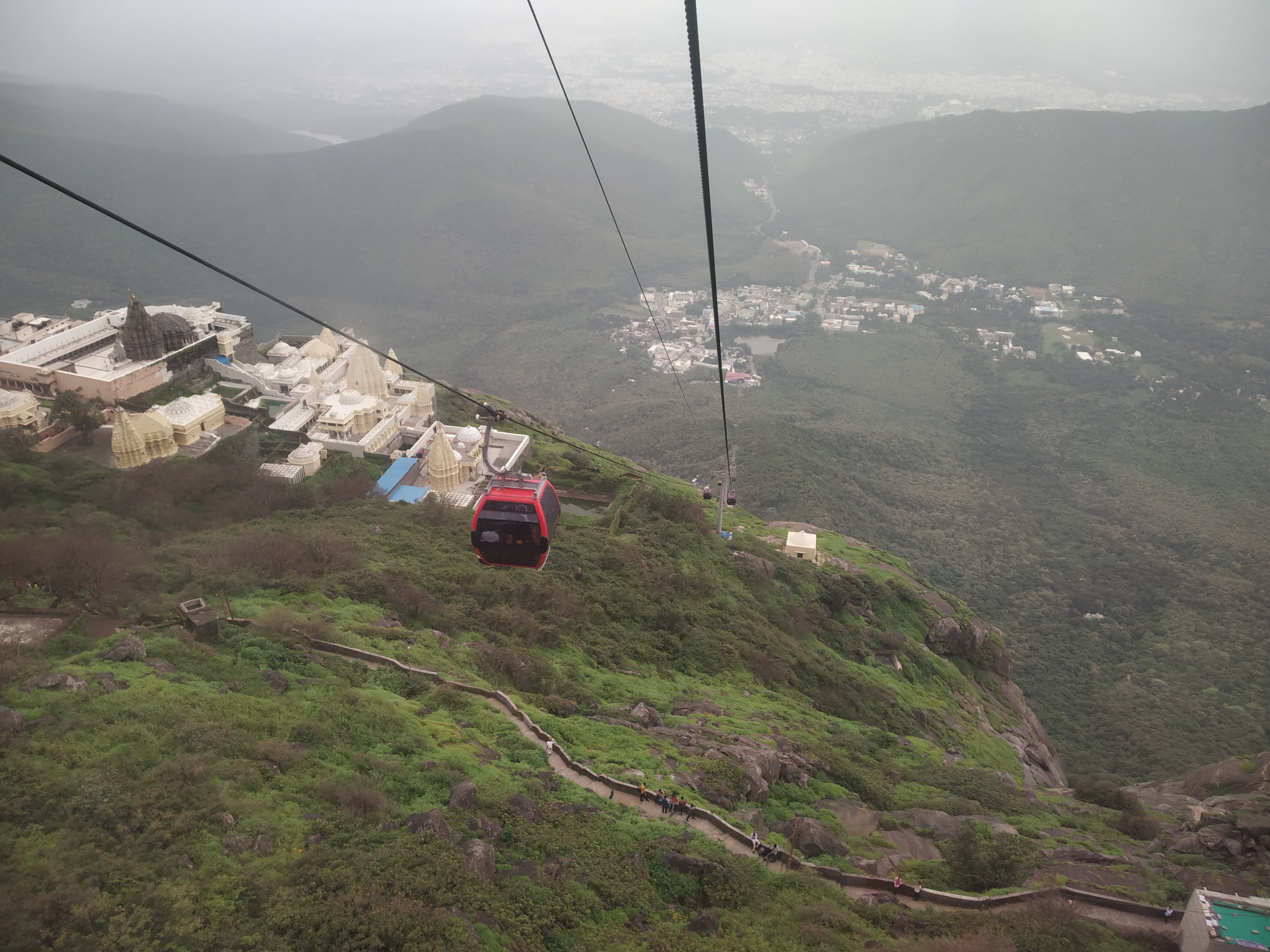

Girnar ropeway is a ropeway on Mount Girnar in Junagadh district, Gujarat, India. First proposed in 1983, the construction started only in September 2018 due to government approval delays and litigation. The construction and operation is managed by Usha Breco Limited. It was inaugurated on 24 October 2020.

== Economy ==
Due to its mountainous geography and forest reserves, Junagadh lacks major industries or plants. The main economic sectors are the mineral-based cement industry, agriculture-based industries, and the power sector. The presence of large reserves of limestone makes the cement industry a thriving industrial sector. Major crops produced in the district are wheat, oil seeds, cotton, mangoes, bananas, onions, and brinjal (eggplant). The total production of oilseeds in Junagadh in 2006–07 was 464,400 metric tons, which was the highest in the state. Junagadh is the largest producer of groundnut and garlic in the state, contributing 26% and 34%, respectively, of total production. Junagadh has Asia's largest ground-nut research laboratory. Mangoes and onions are grown in large quantities in the district.

Some of the large-scale industry present in Junagadh are Mother Dairy Fruit & Vegetable Pvt Ltd (popularly known as Junagadh Dairy in the region), Agro Marine Exports, Creative Castings Ltd., and Austin Engineering. With an investment of INR 4,000 crore (US$975.6million), JSW Power Co. had proposed to set up a coal-based power plant at Simar Village, in Junagadh, but due to difficulties in establishing a port there, it has been shifted to the port of Dahej. Under the new government policy of encouraging biotechnology, Junagadh has been identified as an agriculture biotechnology zone. This will boost the establishment of agro-biotech industries in the district.

Junagadh boasts of some of the best tourist destinations in the state, so tourism is considered to be a progressing sector. The state government has sanctioned the development of a Circuit Tourism project at Junagadh.

== Education ==
Junagadh is an education hub where people from nearby towns and villages come to study.

Schools in Junagadh are either municipal schools run by the municipal council or private schools run by trusts or individuals, which in some cases receive financial aid from the government. The schools are affiliated either with the Gujarat Secondary and Higher Secondary Education Board, the Central Board of Secondary Education, or the International General Certificate of Secondary Education. English and Gujarati are the predominant languages of instruction.

The city is home to Junagadh Agricultural University.

== Culture ==
Established in 1863, Junagadh's Sakkarbaug Zoological Garden, also known as the Sakkarbaug Zoo, is around 210 acre (84 hectares) in size. The zoo provides purebred Asiatic lions for the Indian and international critically endangered species captive breeding programs. Currently, it is the only zoo in the country to house African cheetahs. The zoo also has museum of natural history.

Junagadh's many ruling dynasties—such as Babi Nawabs, Vilabhis, Kshatraps, Mauryas, Chudasamas, Gujarat Sultans—and its religious groups have influenced the architectural syles of Junagadh.

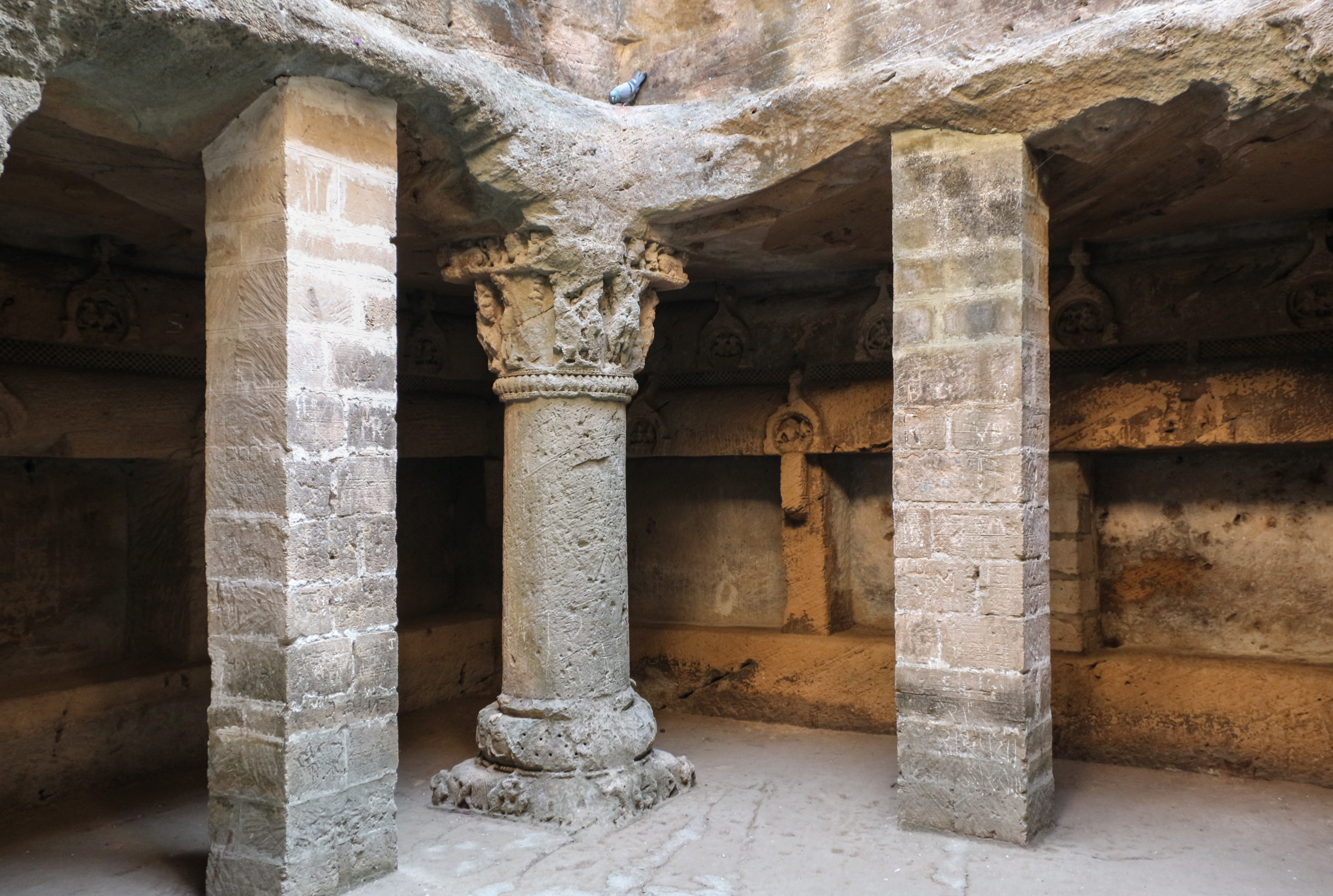
Buddhist cave in Uperkot Fort

The Junagadh Buddhist Cave Groups, with their intricately carved gateways, Chaitya halls, sculptured pillars, and sanctums are classic examples of rock-cut architecture. The Chudama Rajputs left specimens of their architectural style in Nabghan Kuvo and Adi Kadi Vav. Religious monuments such as the Jami Masjid remind us of Muslim architectural patterns. The Ashokan edicts is a classic example of old rock engraving styles. The Maqbaras and numerous age-old palaces in Junagadh tell the story of its rich historical and architectural past.

About 2 kilometres (1.2 mi) east of Junagadh and 3 kilometres (1.9 mi) west of the foot of Girnar Hill is an edict of Emperor Ashoka, inscribed on an uneven rock and dating from the 3rd century BC. The Ashokan edicts impart moral instructions on dharma, harmony, tolerance, and peace. The rock has a circumference of seven metres (23 ft), a height of ten metres (33 ft), and bears inscriptions in Brāhmī script etched with an iron pen.

The people of Junagadh celebrate both Western and Indian festivals. Diwali, Maha Shivaratri, Holi, Janmastami, Muharram, Navratri, Christmas, Good Friday, Dussera, Muharram, and Ganesh Chaturthi are some of the popular festivals in the city.

The Shivaratri Mela is organized at the foot of Mount Girnar (Talati) in the month of Maha (9th day of the month of Maagha). The mela lasts for the next five days. About 500,000 people visit Junagadh on this occasion. The Girnar Parikrama is also organized annually. It starts in the month of Kartik and draws 1 to 1.5 million people. People walk the periphery of the Girnar Hills on foot (about 32 kilometres (20 mi)). Muharram is celebrated by Muslims. The sej, which belonged to the peers or gurus of the nawabs, has been taken out; and a fair has been organized. Apart from these religious and national festivals, Junagadh annually celebrates its accession to India on 9 November 1947 as the independence day of the city. 1 May is Gujarat day, to celebrate the formation of Gujarat state on 1 May 1960.

== Notable ==
- Bapu Velnath Thakor, Koli saint of the 17th century from Junagadh.
- Narsinh Mehta - A Gujarati Poet
- Parveen Babi - Indian film actress
- Shamaldas Gandhi - Indian revolutionary who fought for Junagadh
- Bhavnath mahadev temple

== See also ==
- Girnar Jain temples
- Girnar
- Gir Forest National Park
- Damodar Kund
- Radha Damodar Temple, Junagadh
