= Junagadh Buddhist Cave Groups =

Buddhist cave in Gujarat, India

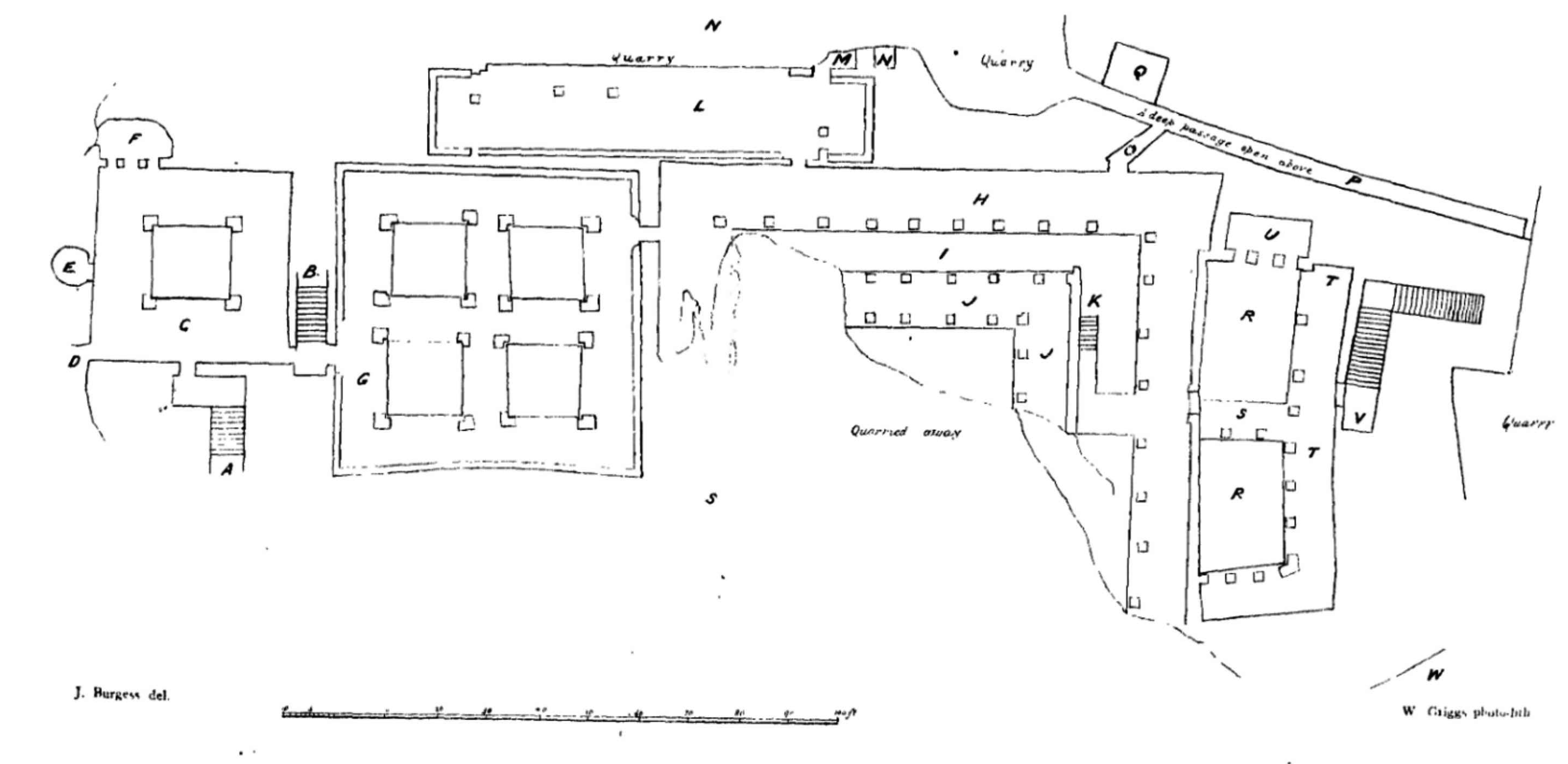
Plan of Khapra Kodiya Caves, Junagadh, Gujarat, India

Junagadh Cave Groups are located in Junagadh district of the Indian state of Gujarat. These caves group includes Uparkot Caves, Khapra Kodiya Caves and Baba Pyare Caves. Three separate sites of rooms carved out of stone to be used as monks' quarters. These caves were carved starting from Emperor Ashoka's period up to 1st–4th century AD.

== Khapra Kodiya Caves ==
The oldest, the Khapara Kodia Caves, on the basis of scribbles and short cursive letters on the wall, are dated to 3rd-4th century BC during the Emperor Ashoka’s rule and are plainest of all cave groups. These caves are also known as Khangar Mahal. They were carved into living rock during the reign of Emperor Ashoka and are considered the earliest monastic settlement in the area. These caves are along the edge of the ancient Sudarshan Lake and little outside Uparkot fort, Northerly. They are carved out in an east–west longitudinal ridge. Caves are small in area. But, it has unique architecture of the water tanks design on western side and L-shaped residence. Caves were used by bhikkus during vassa period. After many years of use, they were abandoned because cracks within that let water seep into living quarters, rendering them unusable. Many accounts say that after this, the monks left for Maharashtra, where they went on to carve many similar and more elaborate structures. Khapara Kodia was damaged by later quarrying, and now only the highest story remains.

== Baba Pyare Caves ==
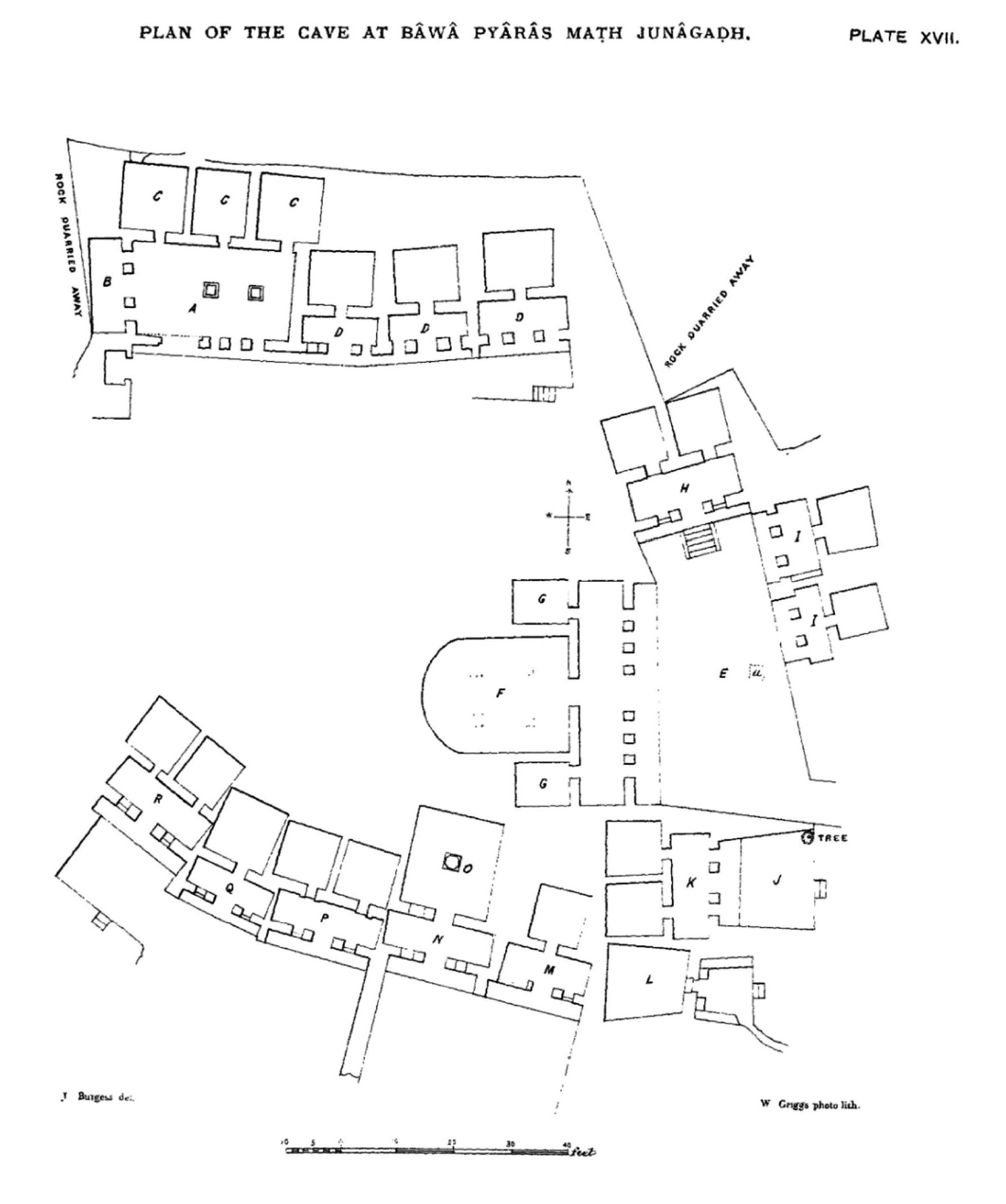
Plan of Bava Pyara Caves

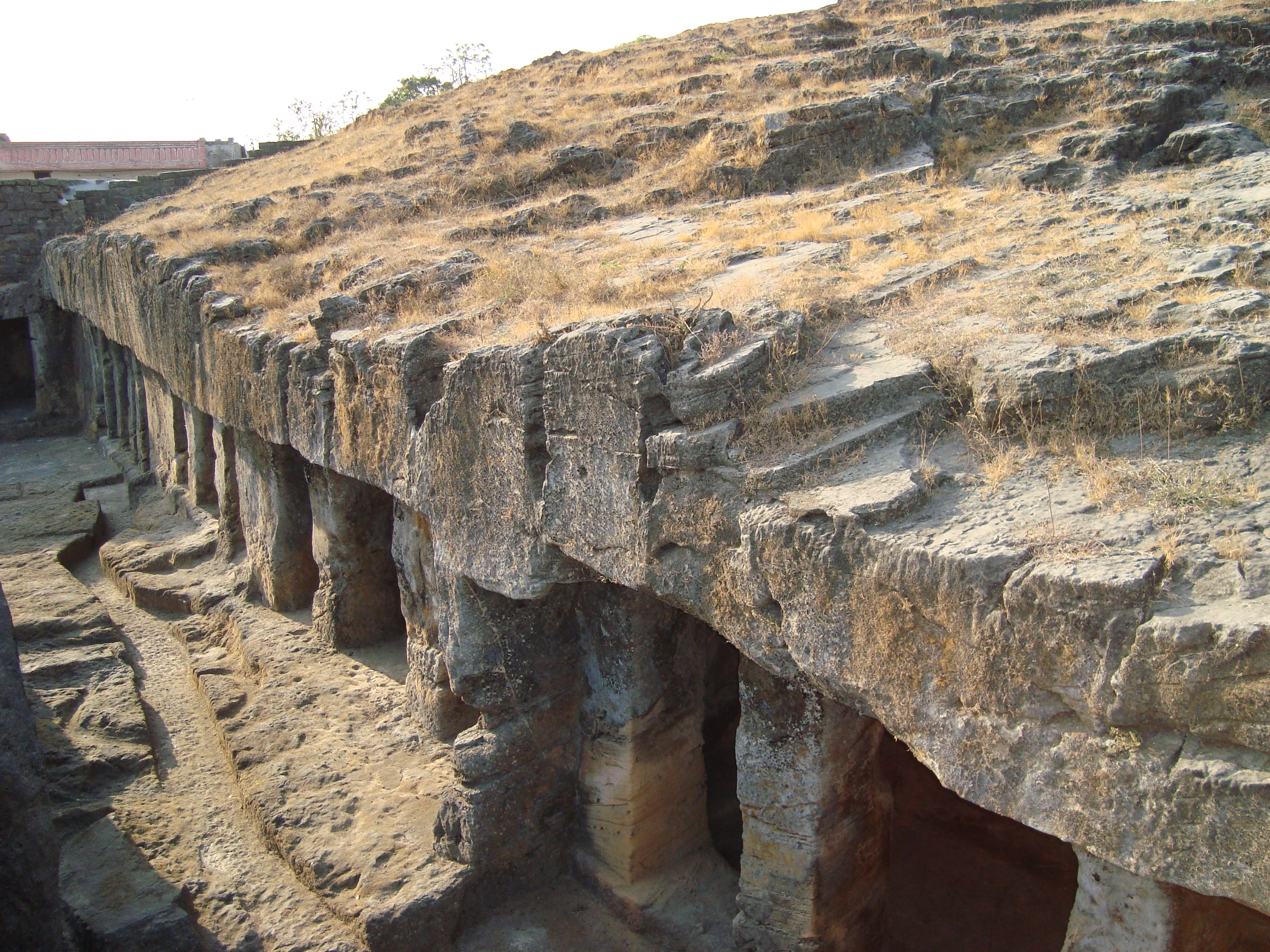
Bava Pyara caves

The Bava Pyara Caves are located near Modhimath, little outside Uparkot fort complex, southernly. These are much more intact than the Khapara Kodia caves. The caves were constructed during the Satavahana regime in 1st–2nd century A.D. According to the Xuanzang's travel account they were constructed in 1st century A.D. Northern group has four caves. South eastern group has chaitya and spacious court. Group has 13 caves modelled in three floors, carved in 45 m. (150 ft.) long, influenced by Buddhist architecture. Bava Pyara caves contains artworks of both Buddhism and Jainism.

== Buddhistic Caves ==
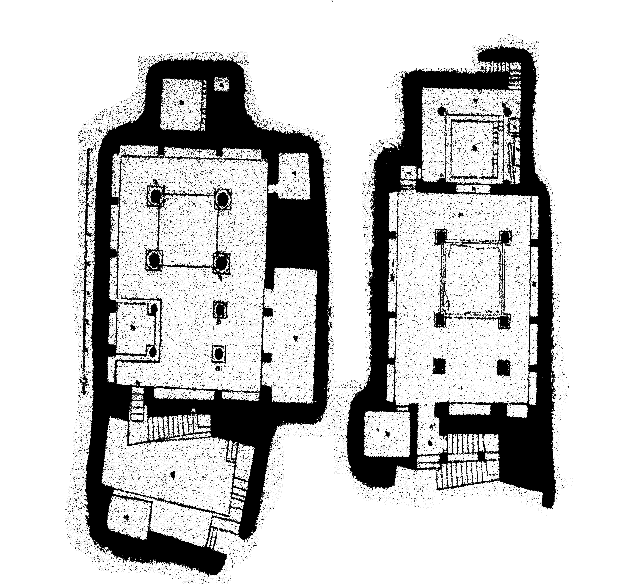
Plan of Uparkot caves; lower floor (left) and upper floor (right)

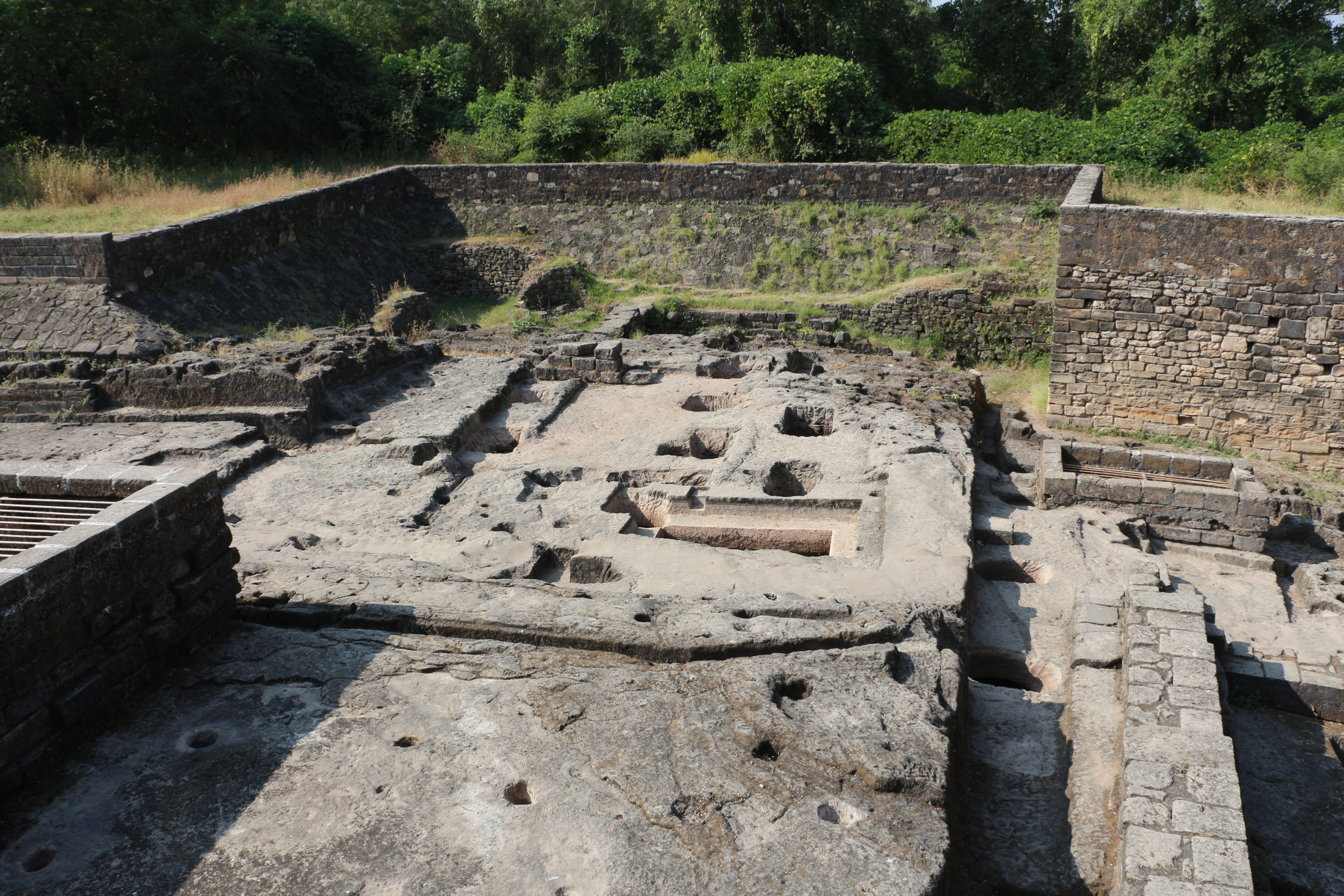
Upper floor of the Uperkot caves

These caves located at Uperkot beyond the 300 feet deep moat, close to Adi Kadi Vav, were carved in 2nd–3rd century A.D. These caves have influence of Satvahana architecture with combination of Graeco- Scythian style. According to ASI "The cave group is in three tiers, with all members of each galleries shown in semi-relief, but only two storeys having regular floors. The upper floor has a deep tank, covered on three sides with verandahs and Kakshasana on west and north-west side. Lower floor has with corridor and pillars. The lower floor has exquisitely carved pillars whose base, shaft and capital carry unique decorative design." These caves are gilded with beautiful pillars and entrances, water cisterns, horseshoe-shaped chaitya windows, an assembly hall and cell for meditation.
