= Khapra Kodiya Caves =

Part of the Junagadh Buddhist Cave Group, India

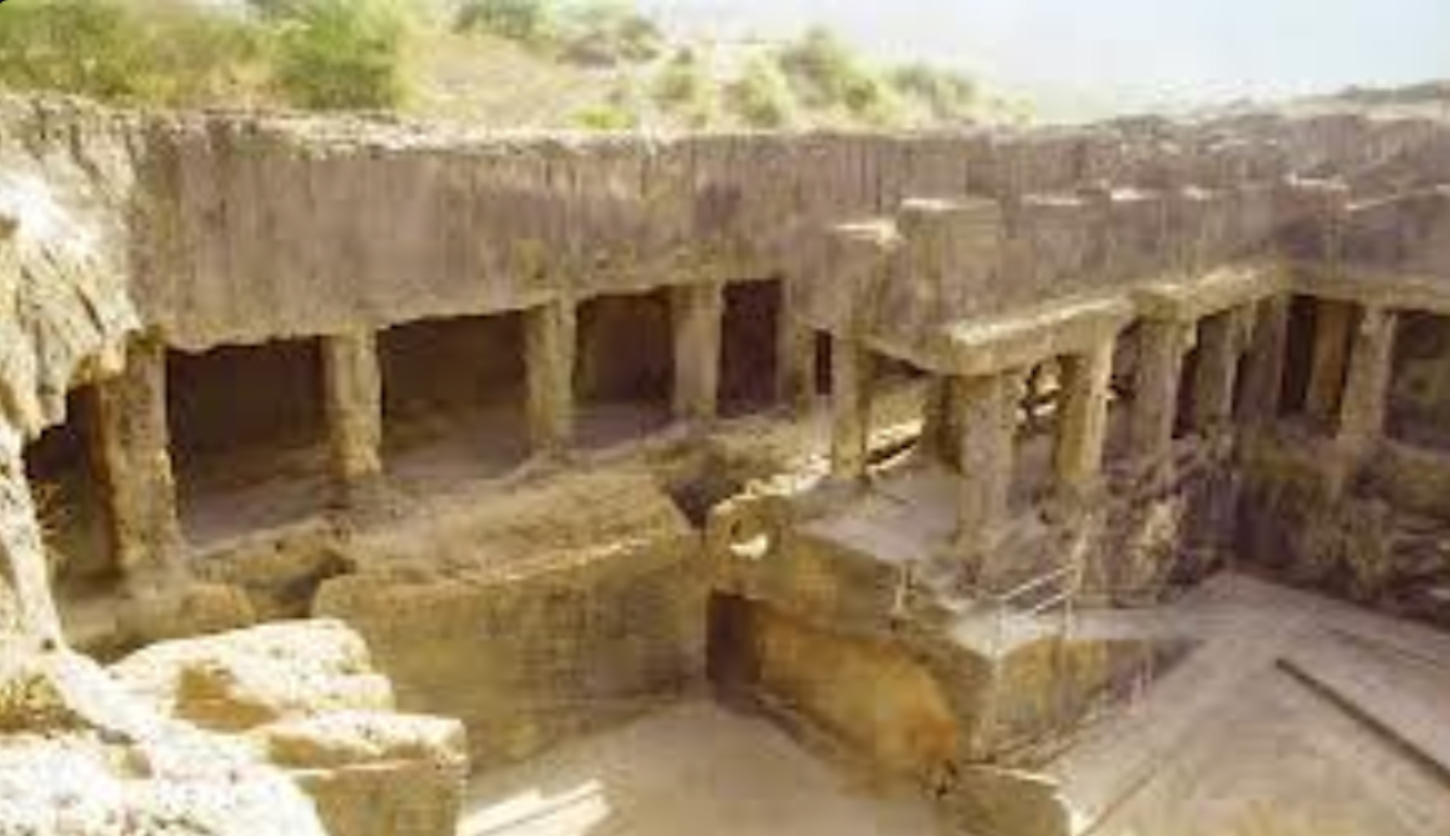
- Khapra Kodiya Caves

- Location within India Location within Gujarat
- Coordinates: 21.529933°N 70.468088°E

The Khapra Kodiya Caves are part of the Junagadh Buddhist Cave Group. They are the oldest of the caves in the group. The caves, on the basis of scribbles and short cursive letters on the wall, are dated to 3rd-4th century BCE during the Emperor Ashoka's rule and are the plainest of all the caves in the groups. These caves are also known as Khangar Mahal. They were carved in rock during the reign of Emperor Ashoka and are considered the earliest monastic settlement in the area. These caves are along the edge of the ancient Sudarshan Lake (which no longer exists) and a little outside Uparkot fort, to the north.

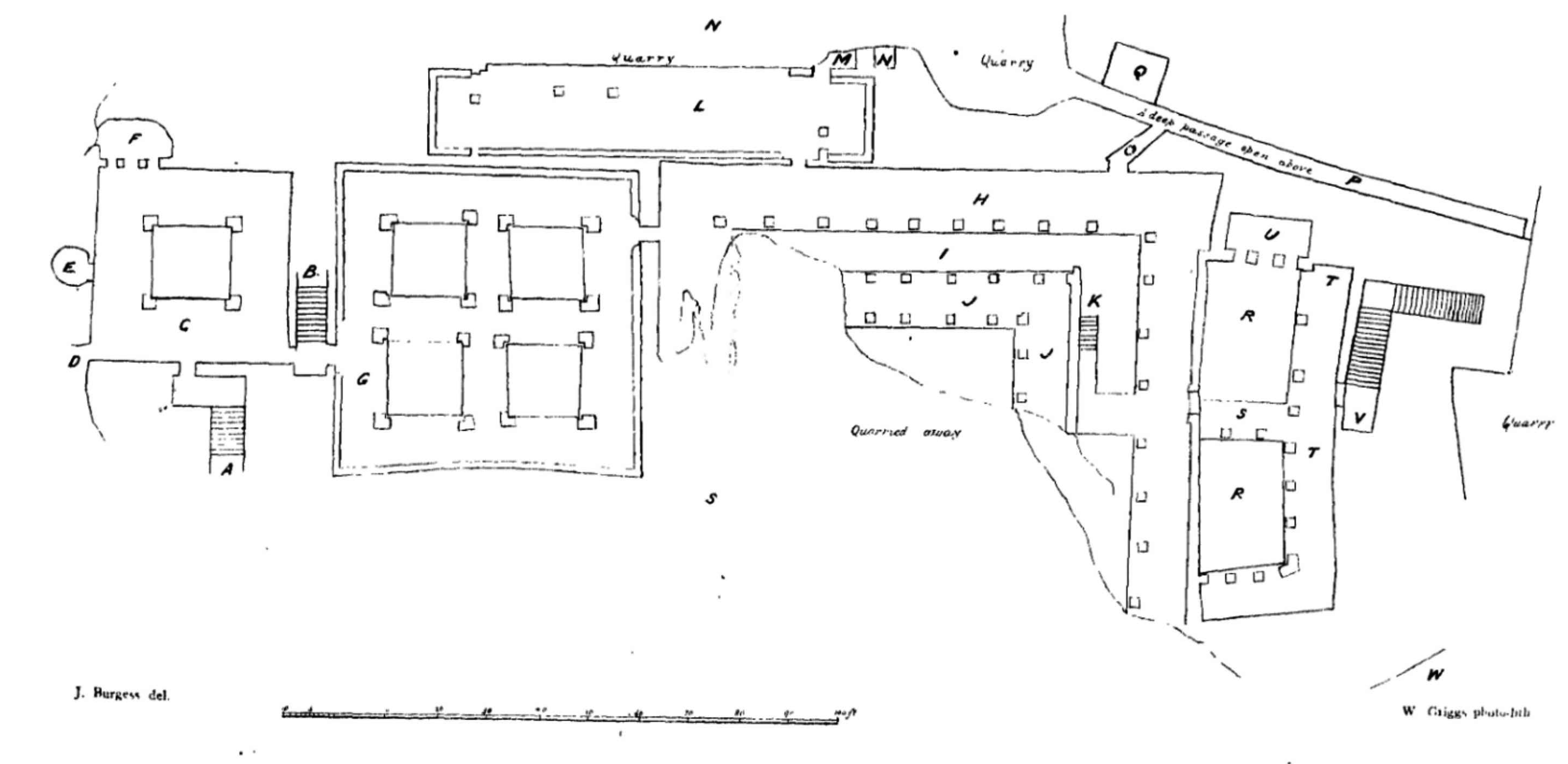
Plan of the caves.

The caves are carved out in an east–west longitudinal ridge. They are small in area. But the architecture of the water tanks is unique, and the caves form an L-shaped residence. Caves were used by bhikkus during vassa period. After many years of use, they were abandoned because cracks within the caves let water seep into living quarters, rendering them unusable. Many accounts say that after this, the monks left for Maharashtra, where they went on to carve many similar and more elaborate structures. Khapara Kodia was damaged by later quarrying, and now only the highest story remains.

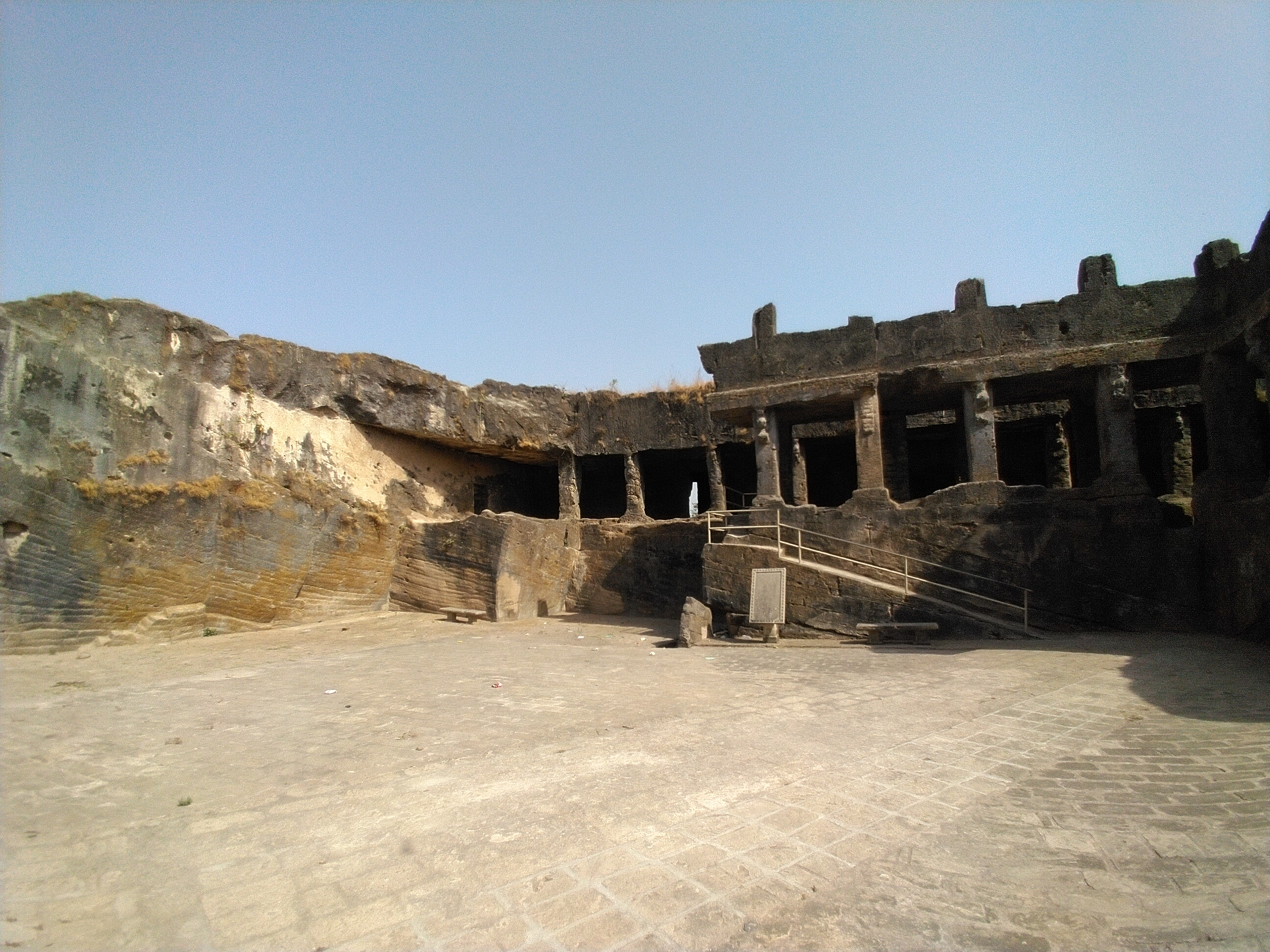
Frontside of the caves

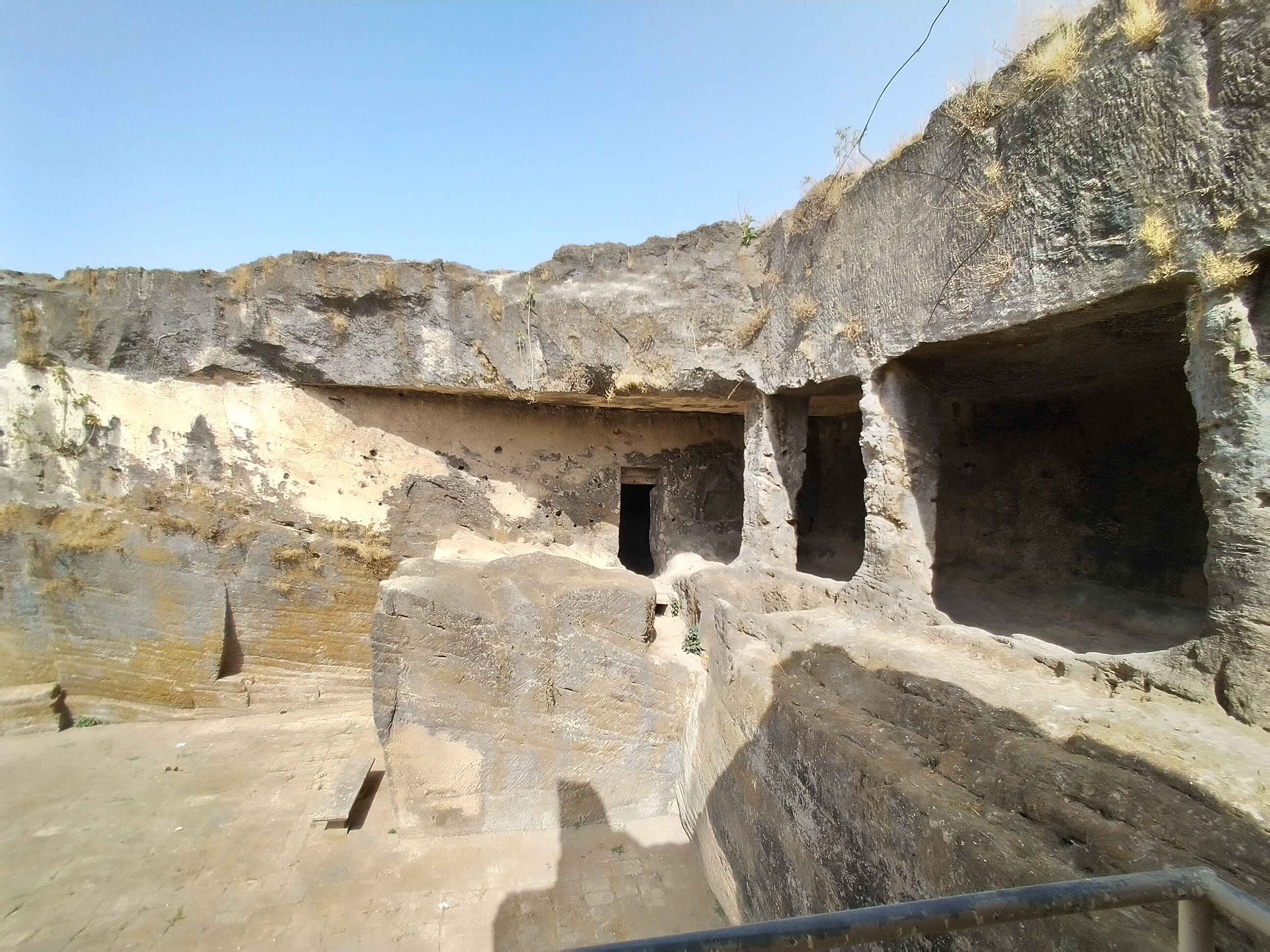
Entry Passage

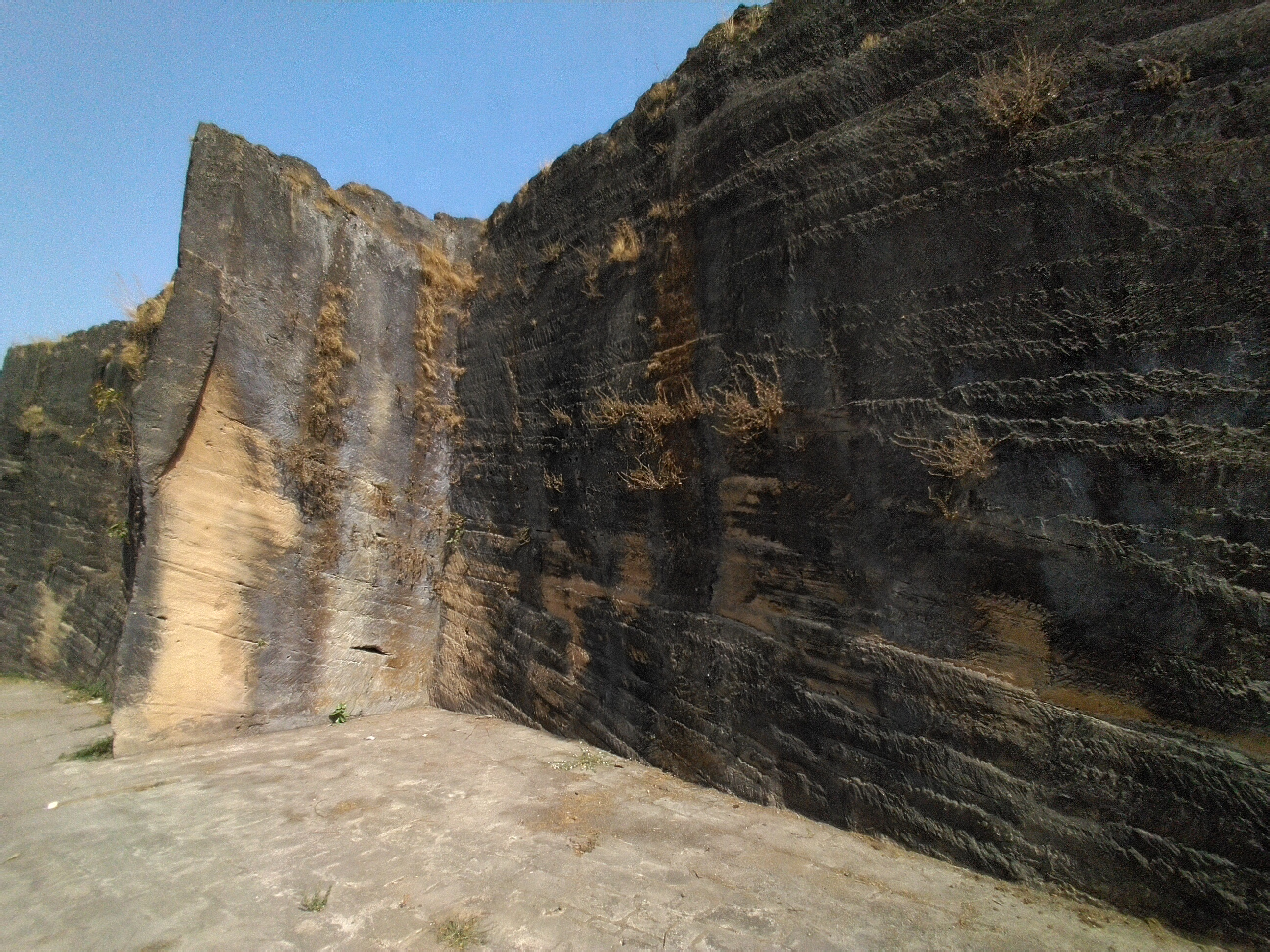
Outer wall

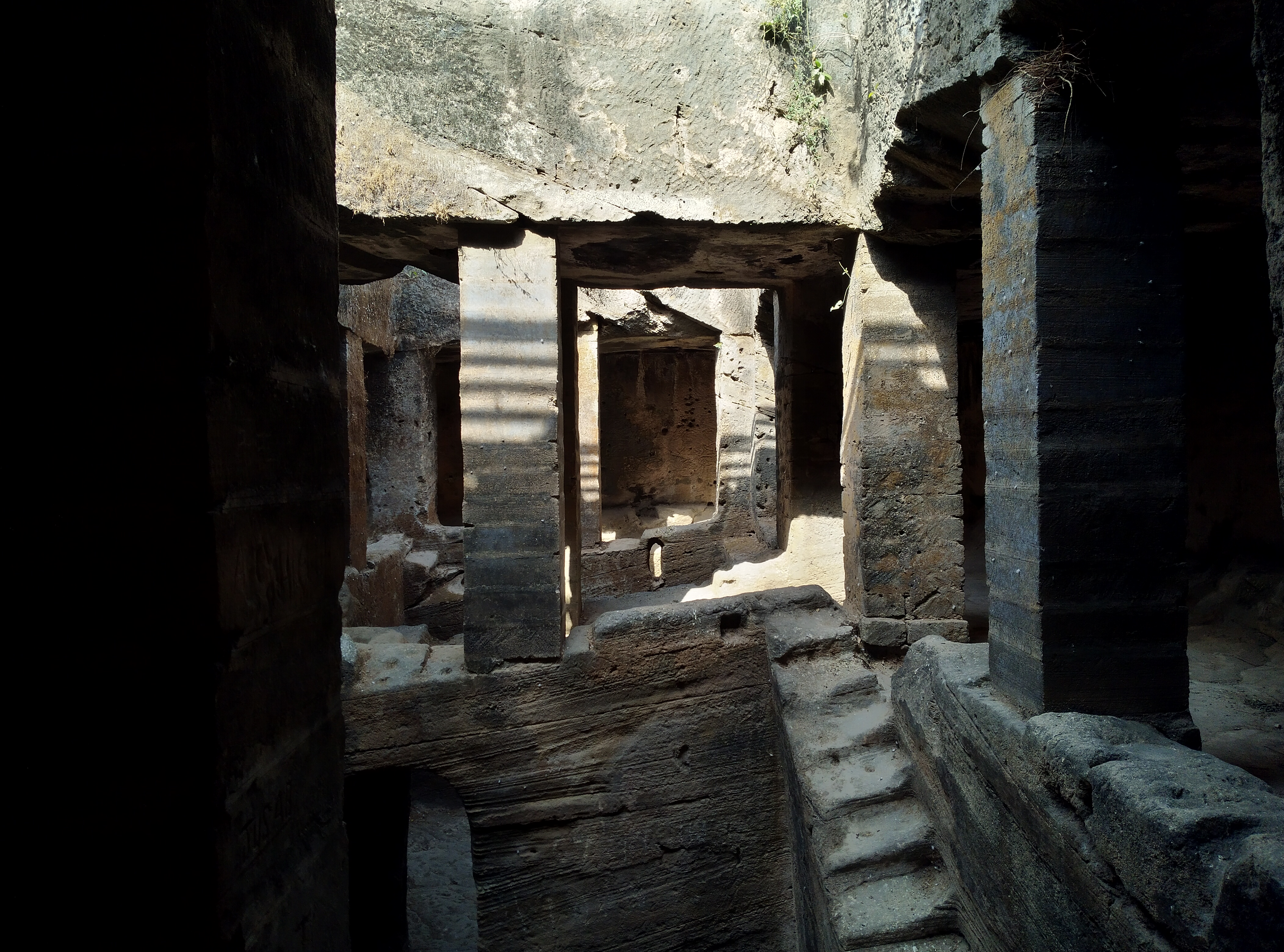
Underground room

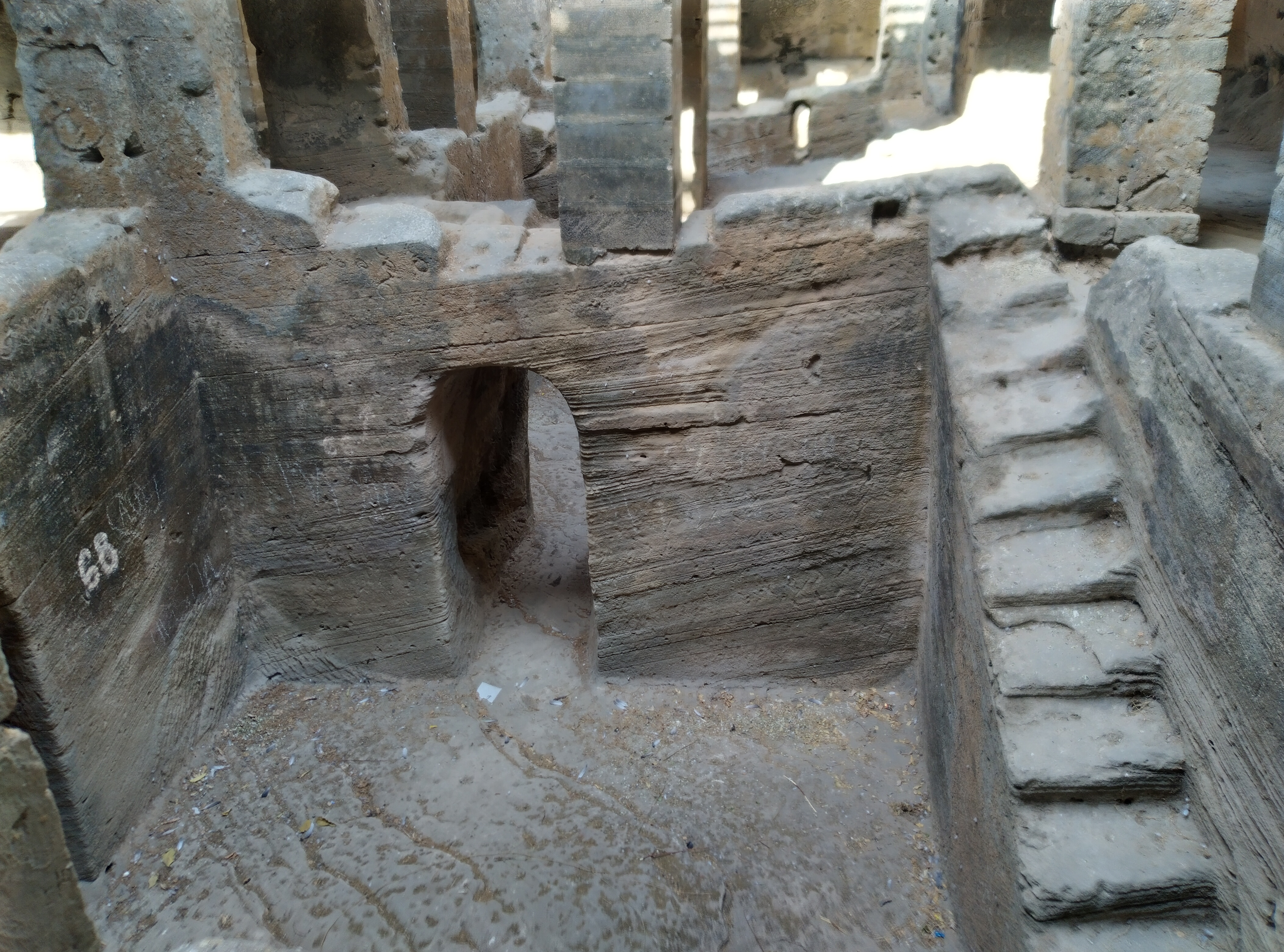
Underground room with entrygate to another room

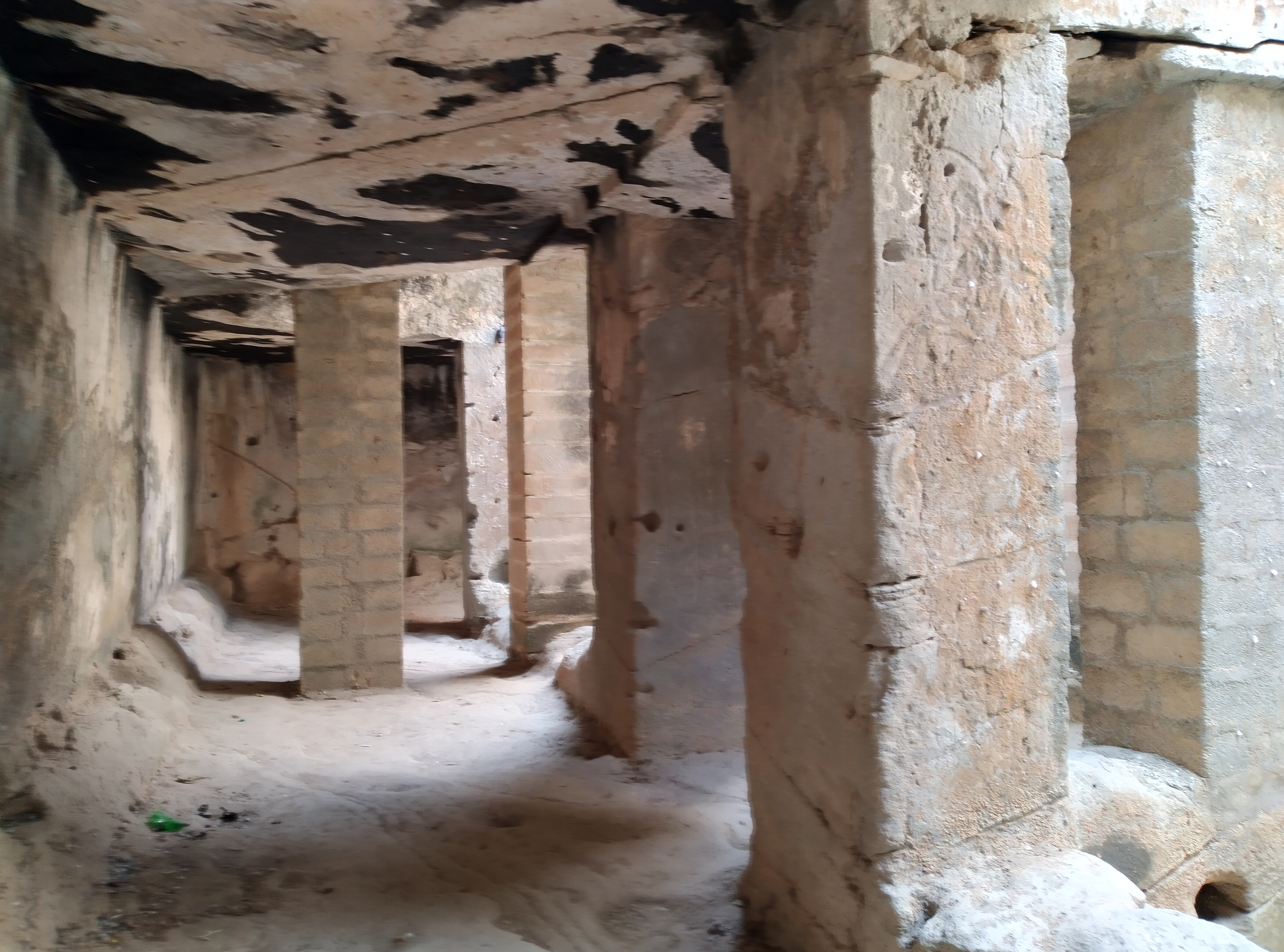
Supporting pilars
