= Bava Pyara Caves =

Caves in Gujarat, India

Bava Pyara caves
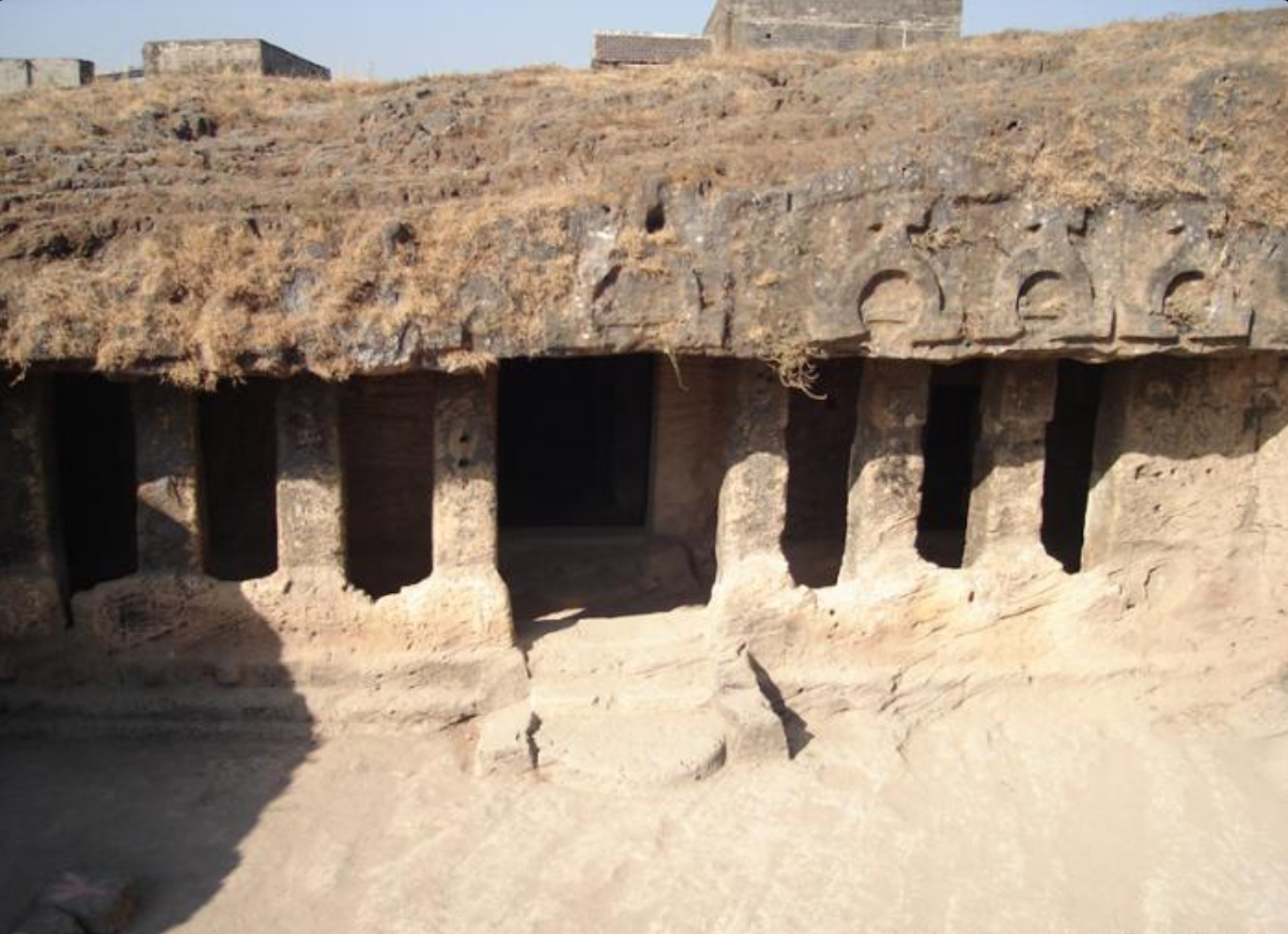
- Bava Pyara caves

- Location within India Location within Gujarat
- Coordinates: 21.519878°N 70.470133°E

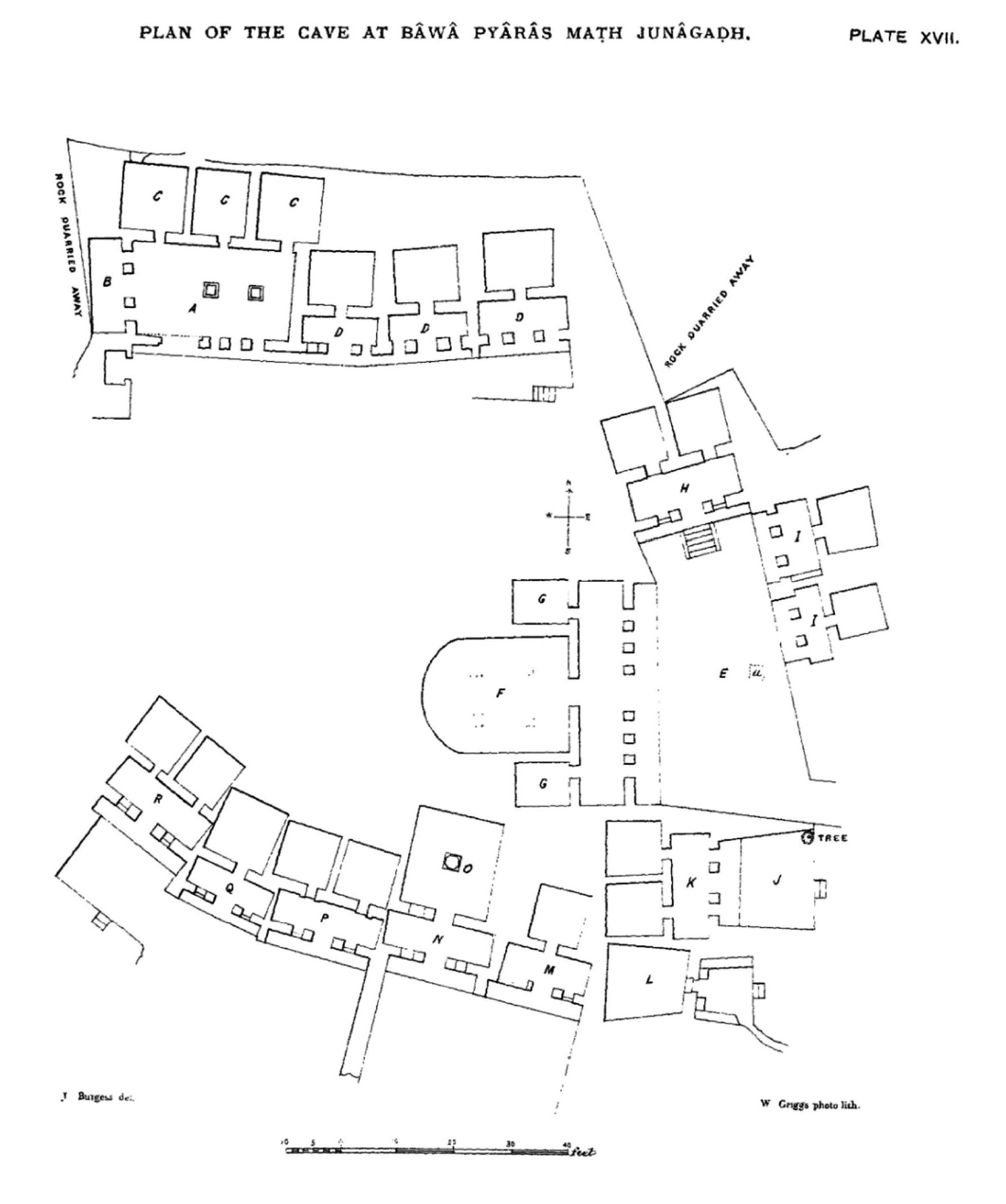
Plan of Bava Pyara caves

Bava Pyara caves (also known as Baba Pyara caves) are an example of ancient man-made caverns. The caves are a part of the Junagadh Buddhist Cave Groups situated in the eastern part of Junagadh of the Indian state of Gujarat. Bava Pyara caves contains artworks of both Buddhism and Jainism.

== Caves ==
These caves are arranged in three lines; the first line on the north-facing southwards, the second line on the south from the east end of the first line, and the third line runs back of the second line in west-north-west. The second line has a primitive flat-roofed chaitya cave having simple cells on either side of it with extra cells on the north and east of it.

The Bava Pyara caves were visited by James Burgess, an English archaeologist and founder of The Indian Antiquary. He concluded that they have affiliated with both Buddhism and Jainism. According to Burgess these caves were initially built for Buddhists bhikkhus and were in a later period occupied by Jain ascetics. He was not certain about the exact age of the ancient caves. One fragmentary inscription was found in the Bava Pyara cave that affirms its affiliation to Jainism because one term in that inscription is exclusively used by Jains. The inscription was read as "केवलज्ञान संप्राप्तानां जीतजरामरणानां ".

The term kevalgyan was used exclusively by Jains. Scholar H. D. Sankalia attributes these caves to Jainism because of some auspicious symbols typical of Jainism that is depicted above the door's frame. Sankalia recorded about eleven auspicious symbols, "Nandhyavarta", "Swastika", "Darpan", "Bhadrasana", "Meen Yugal" and "Purna Ghata". Such symbols were also found on Ayagpattas from Kankali Teela Mathura. About five such symbols are found in another cave of Bava pyara Caves. These symbols are in a bad state and not recorded, although they were identified as Darpan, Meen Yugal, Purna Ghat, Meen Yugal, Darpan. On a small entrance of one of the caves in the second row at the south end are two symbols depicting Vyala figures. Burgess and Sanklia failed to notice them. According to Madhusudan Dhaky, based on the Vyala figure, the Bava pyara cave is from the 2nd or 3rd century AD. Sankalia claimed that the Chaityagruh containing cave should be at least from the 2nd century BC, and caves with symbols carving should be hailed from 2nd or 3rd century AD.

== Image gallery ==
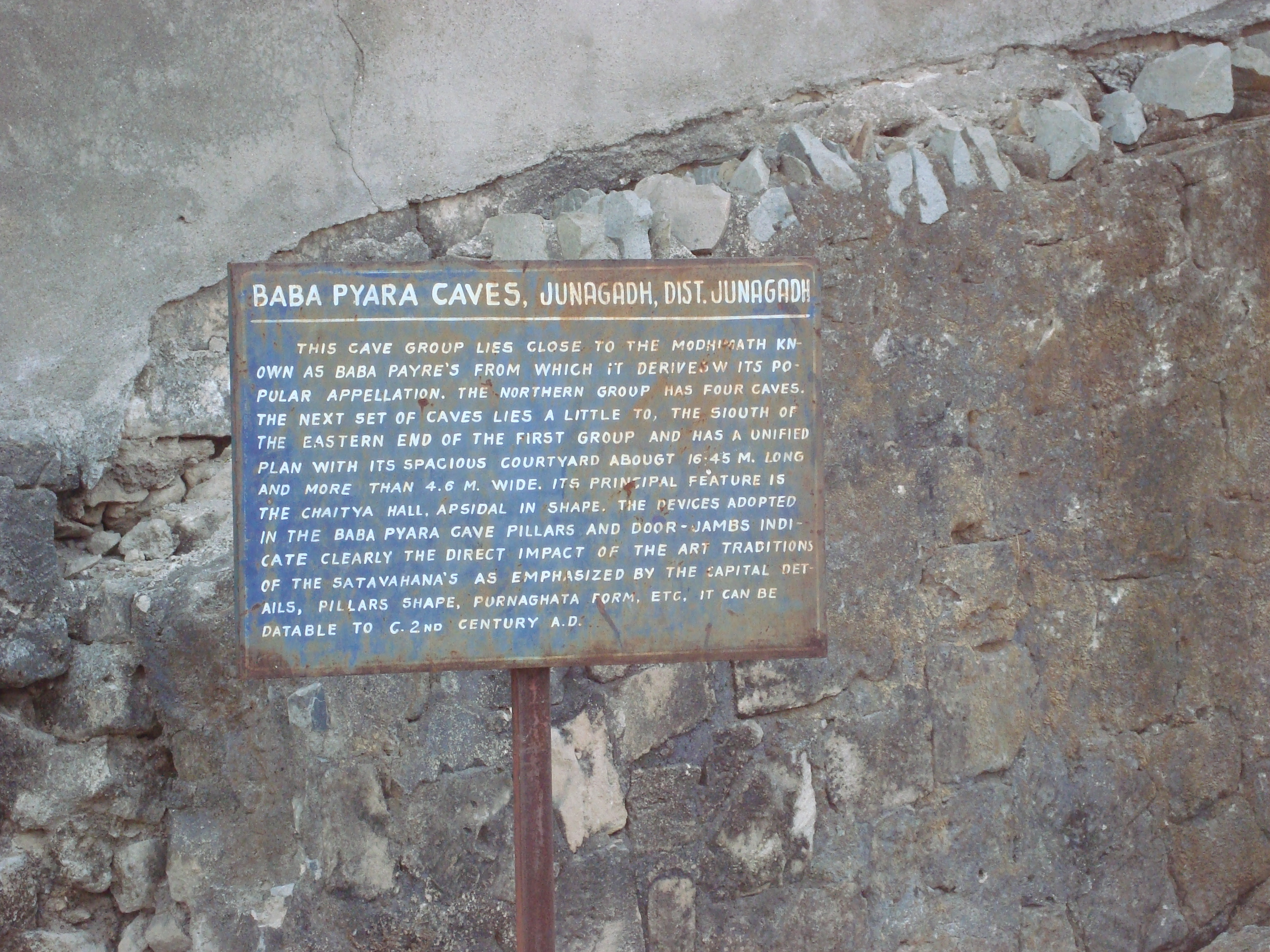
Bava Pyara caves

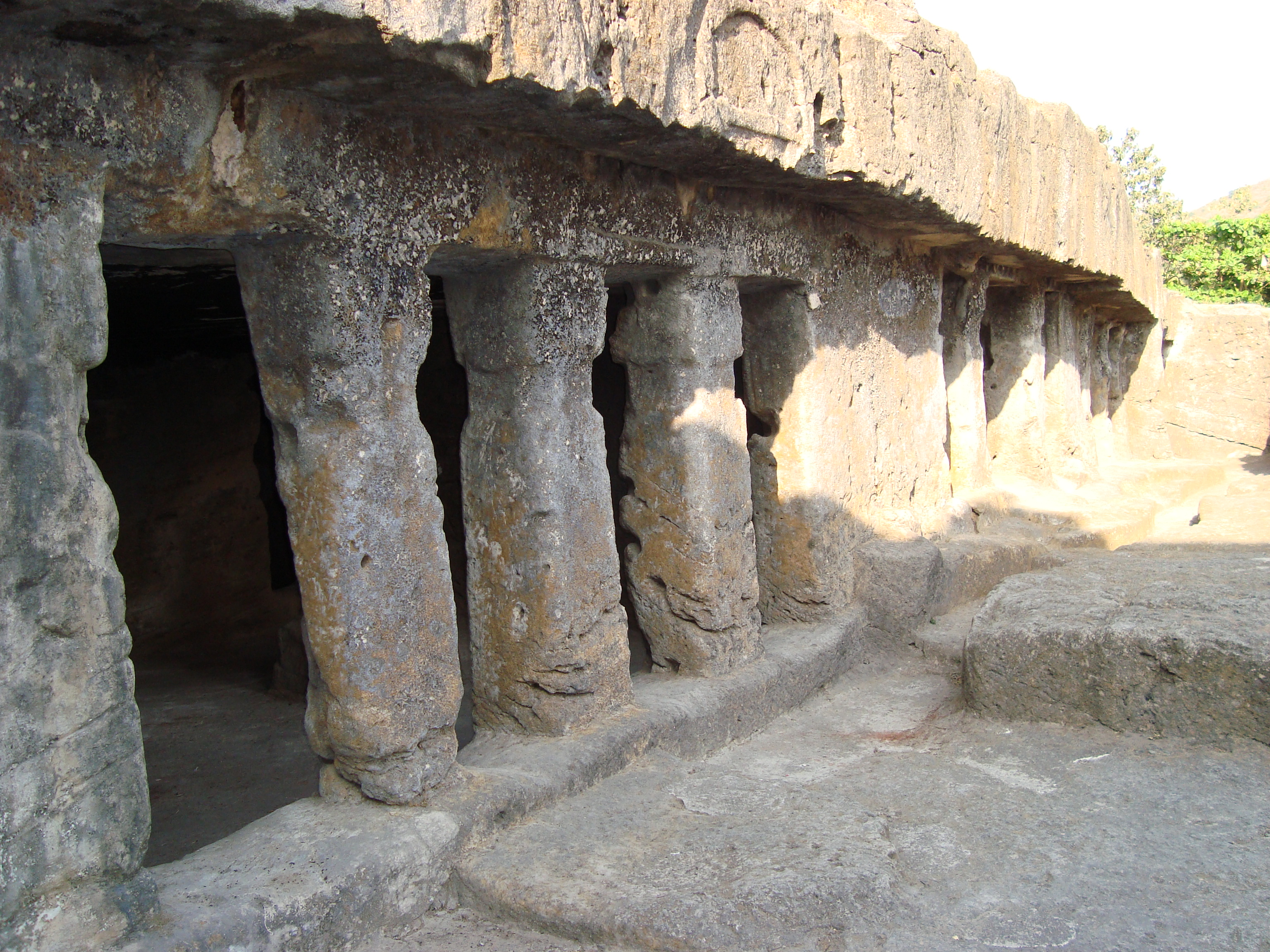
Bava Pyara caves

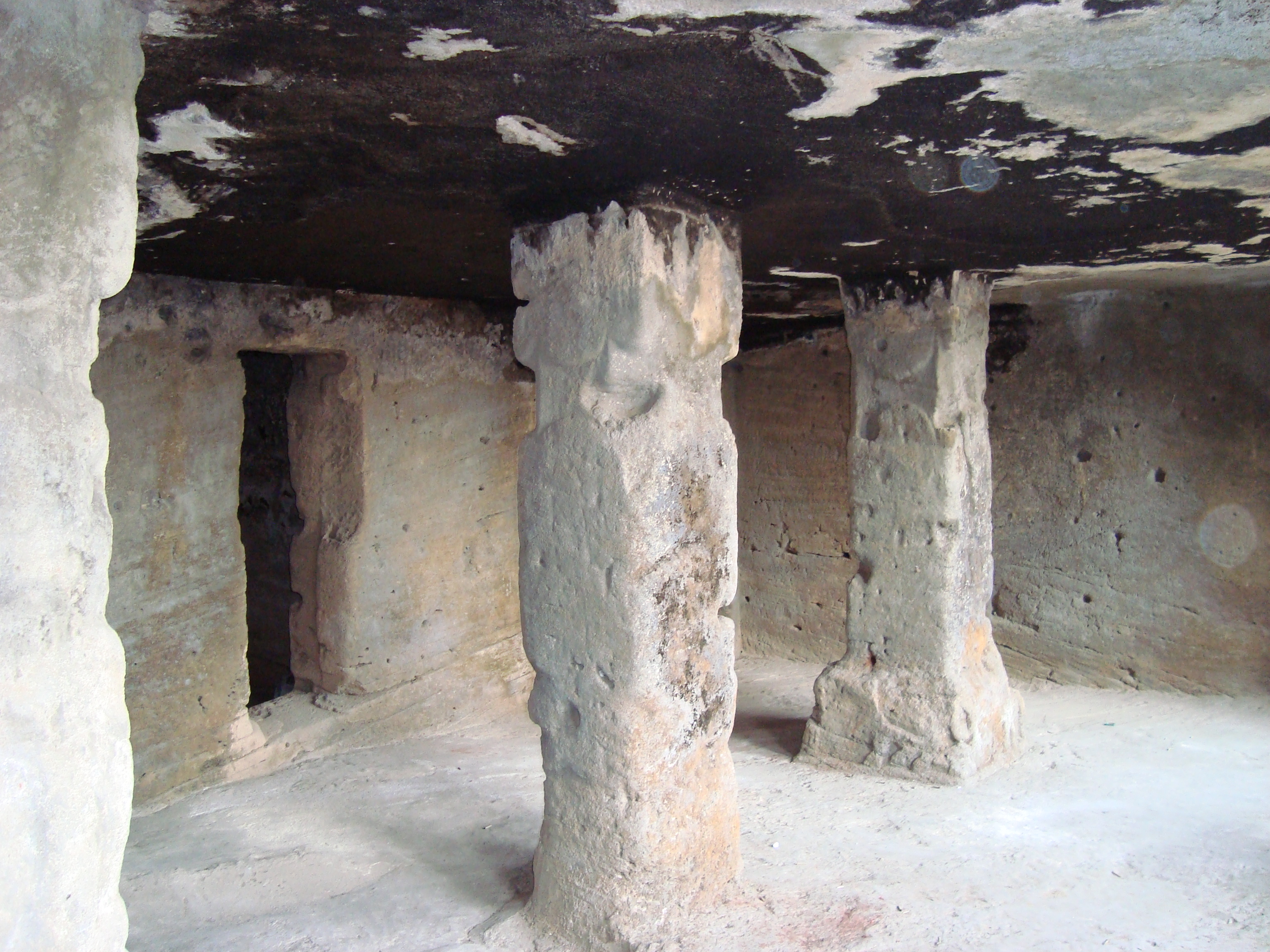
Bava Pyara caves

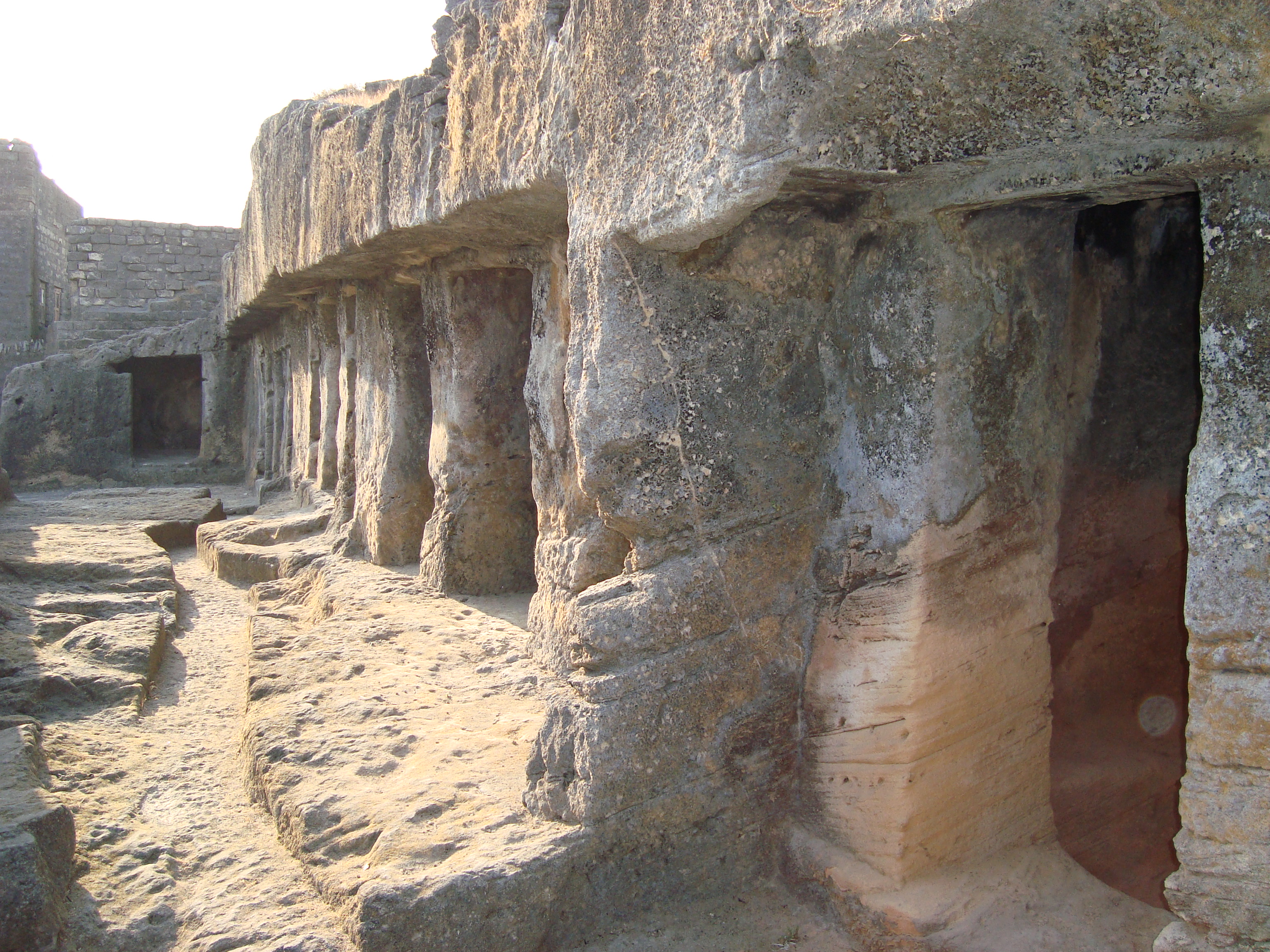
Bava Pyara caves
