= Navaghana (late 11th century king) =

Navaghana was a Chudasama King of Saurashtra region of western India who reigned in the late 11th century. His capital was at Junagadh. He was a contemporary of Jayasimha Siddharaja, the Chaulukya ruler of Anahilapataka. According to bardic legends, Jayasimha attacked during his reign and he was defeated and became is vassal. He moved capital to Junagadh. He was succeeded by Khengara who had vowed to take revenge.

== Defeat by Jayasimha Siddharaja ==
Jayasimha's Dahod inscription (VS 1196/1140 CE) boasts that he imprisoned the king of Saurashtra; this is most probably a reference to his victory over Khengara. In Siddha-Haima-Shabdanushasana, Hemachandra has given two examples of grammar mentioning Jayasimha's victory over Saurashtra. The verses attributed to Ramachandra, disciple Hemachandra, in Prabandha-Chintamani of Merutunga, Jayasimha is referred as Giridurgamalla, i. e. the "Champion of the Giridurga or Junagadh". The Prabandhachintamani also mentions Jayasimha's victory over Saurashtra.

Jain chronicler Prabhachandra, in Prabhavaka-charitra, mentions that Jayasimha had first dispatched an army led by Kirtipala (brother of Kumarapala) to attack Navaghana. When this army was unsuccessful, another force led by Udayana was dispatched in its support. This joint army defeated Navagaha, but Udayana was killed in the battle.

Gulab Chandra Chaudhary opines that Merutunga, in Prabandha-chintamani, wrongly identifies Navaghana with Khengara; mentioning Navaghana in prose and Khengara in verses while all other sources mention Khengara. Based on the multiple tales and Navaghna's confusion with Khengara, Campbell theorises that Jayasimha might have led multiple expeditions against the more than one king with similar names.

=== Prabandha-chintamani's Navaghana ===
In Prabandha-chintamani, Merutunga has given following account of Navaghana but it may be applied to Khengara if his identification in incorrect:

Navaghana is mentioned as the Ranaka, similar to Hemachandra's reference to Graharipu in Dvyashraya. Merutunga claims in his prose that Navaghana defeated Jayasimha eleven times, but Jayasimha went himself twelfth time after capturing newly fortified Vardhamanapura (now Wadhwan). Merutunga's claim cannot be taken literally: 12 was a favourite number of the Jain writers, and he may have used the number to emphasize the seriousness of the war. Jayasimha besieged Junagadh fort. Navaghana's nephews had agreed to show secret entry of the fort on condition that Jayasimha will not kill Navaghana with weapons but with coins which they meant that Jayasimha will only collect a tribute from him. When Jayasimha entered the fort, he captured Navaghana from his great palace in which he was hidden by his queen. He was not killed with weapons but he was beaten to death with vessels full of coins.

==== Bardic legends ====
===== Khengara's vows =====
The bardic tales says that Navaghana was defeated and insulted by Jayasimha who compelled him on one occasion to take grass in his mouth and make submission. Navaghana was also enraged against Harraj of Umeta on the Mahi River (also referred as Harraj Mahida) and contrived also to have a feud with the Vaghela of Bhoira. He was much displeased with a Charan named Mesan who had insulted him and thus he had vowed that he would split this Charan's cheeks.

Navaghana had four sons; Shatrashalji, the founder of the houses of Bhadli, Sarva and Gamph; Devghanji and Savghanji who received the Osham Chorasi; and Khengara who succeeded him.

It is said that when Navaghana lay a dying his spirit would not pass from his frame until his sons would promise to perform four behests with which he charged them. These were; to slay Harraj of Umeta, to destroy the fort of Bhoira, to break down the gate of Anahilapataka (Patan) and to split the cheeks of a Charan named Mesan who had spoken disrespectfully of him. Khengar alone undertook to perform these four tasks and poured water into his father's hand as a token that he had sworn perform these deeds. Then Navaghana died. Khengara succeeded Navaghana and made Junagadh his capital, though often residing at Vanthali.

When Khengara was informed that Jayasimha was absent in Anahilapataka warring in Malwa, he marched to Anahilapataka and broke down one of the gates. He carried off the wooden gates to Junagadh and put them up in the Kalve gateway at that town. He then advanced to Umeta killed Harraj and washed his blade in the Mahi River and on his return he passed by Bhoira and broke down the fortress thereof. When he returned to Junagadh, he sent for the Charan and filled his mouth with gold and jewels until he said, "My cheeks are split"; thus fulfilling the vow and afterwards he bestowed on him the village called after him Mesanka near Palitana.

The breaking of gates of Anahilapataka had enraged Jayasimha and he later attacked Junagadh in which Khengara lost eventually. The bards also mentions the Ranakadevi as the immediate cause of war.

== Dates and succession ==
Based on the literature, it known that he was a contemporary of Jayasimha Siddharaja who reigned from c. 1092 – c. 1142 CE thus Navaghana must be reigning during the early years of his reign. He was succeeded by his son Khengara according to bardic tales who is also mentioned in the literature related to Jayasimha.

According to the Gazetteer of the Bombay Presidency, Navaghana reigned from 1067-1098 CE and he was succeeded by his son Khengara. Though these dates are not reliable.

== Constructions ==
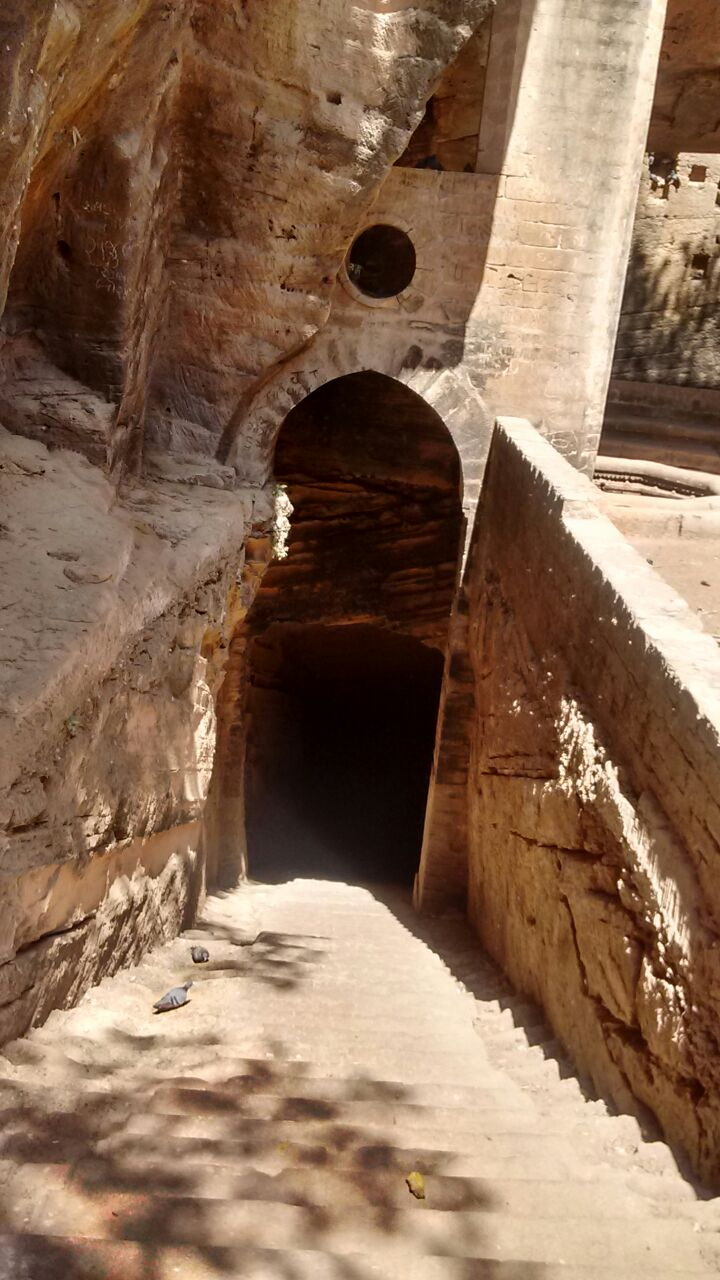
Navghan kuvo named after Chudasama ruler Navghana

Navghan Kuvo is named after Navaghana. The forecourt to reach the well was probably built during his reign in 11th century. It is believed to have been completed by his son Khengara.
