= Ranakdevi (disambiguation) =

Ranakdevi or Ranakadevi is a legendary 12th-century queen associated with a folklore in the Saurashtra region of Gujarat, India.

Ranakdevi may also refer to these depictions of the Indian queen:

- Ranakdevi (1883), a Gujarati novel written by Anantprasad Trikamlal Vaishnav
- Ranakdevi (1923), a silent film directed by S. N. Patankar
- Ranakdevi (1930), a silent film directed by Nanubhai Vakil
- Ranakdevi (1946), a Gujarati film directed by V. M. Vyas
- Ranakdevi (1973), a Gujarati film directed by Babubhai Mistry
