= Navghan Kuvo =

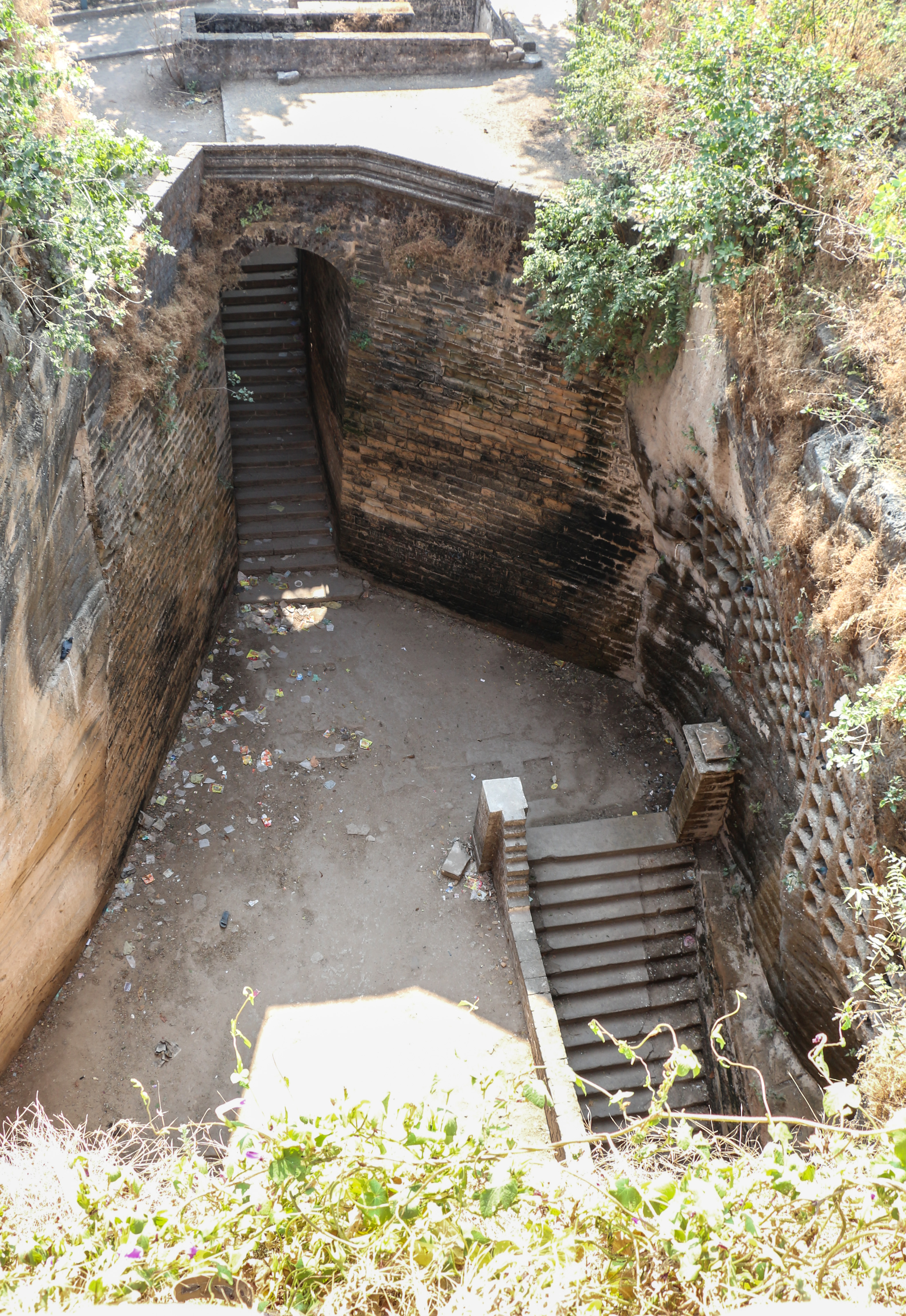
- Flight of steps leading to forecourt of the stepwell
- Interactive map of the Navghan Kuvo area

General information
- Type: Stepwell
- Architectural style: Indian architecture
- Location: Uparkot Fort, Junagadh, India
- Coordinates: 21.5238°N 70.4692°E
- Construction started: 2nd-7th century
- Completed: 11th-12th century

Design and construction
- Architect: Local
- Designations: ASI State Protected Monument No. S-GJ-116

Navghan Kuvo is a stepwell in Uparkot Fort, Junagadh, Gujarat, India.

== History ==
Navghan Kuvo is named after the Chudasama king Ra Navaghana. The forecourt to reach the well was probably built during his reign in 11th century. It is believed to have been completed by his son Khengara.

The well is considered older than the forecourt. It is an oldest example of the stepwell according to some scholars. It is near the Uparkot Caves. The well might have been built in Kshatrapa period (2nd-4th century) or in Maitraka period (6th-7th century).

It is a state protected monument (S-GJ-116).

== Architecture ==
A small staircase entered through an arched doorway leads to the forecourt. The well is located at the far end of the forecourt. The water in the well is reached by a circular staircase which is cut in the soft rock behind thin stone wall of the shaft of well. The flight of the steps, first straight and then transverse, turns right around the shaft. The array of square holes in the stone wall of the shaft illuminate and cool the inside.

== Gallery ==
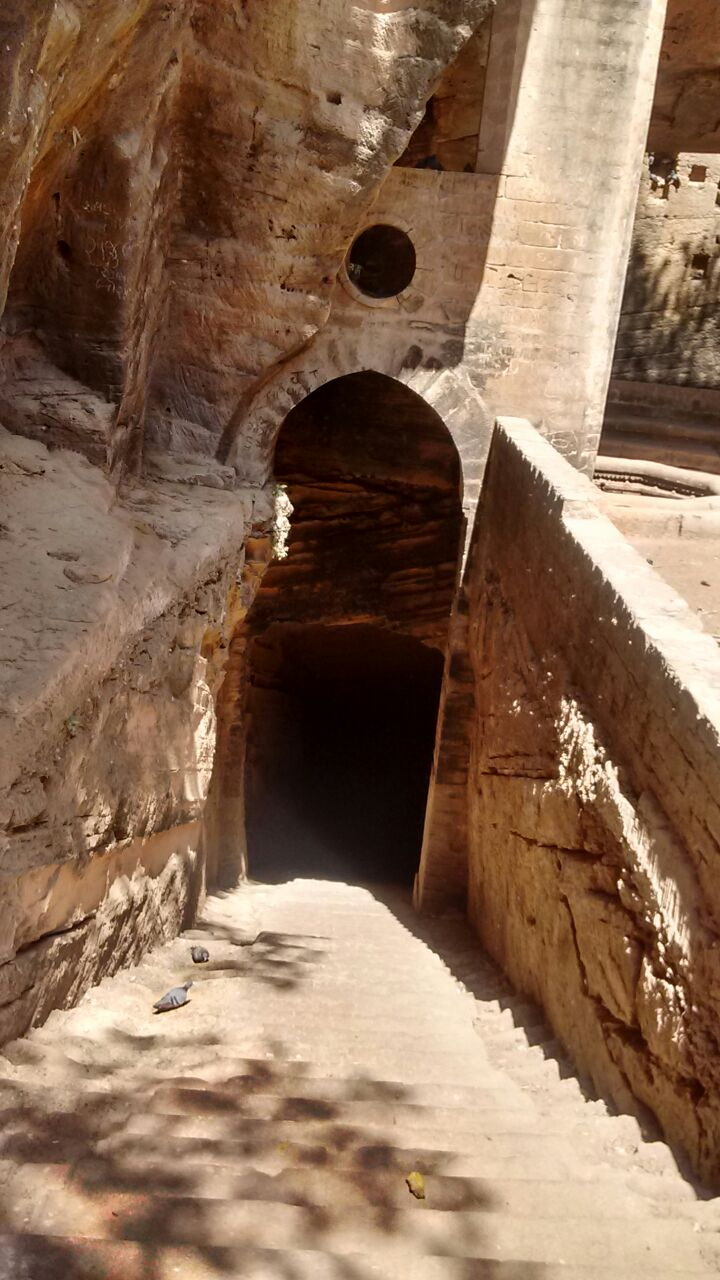
Entrance of the stepwell

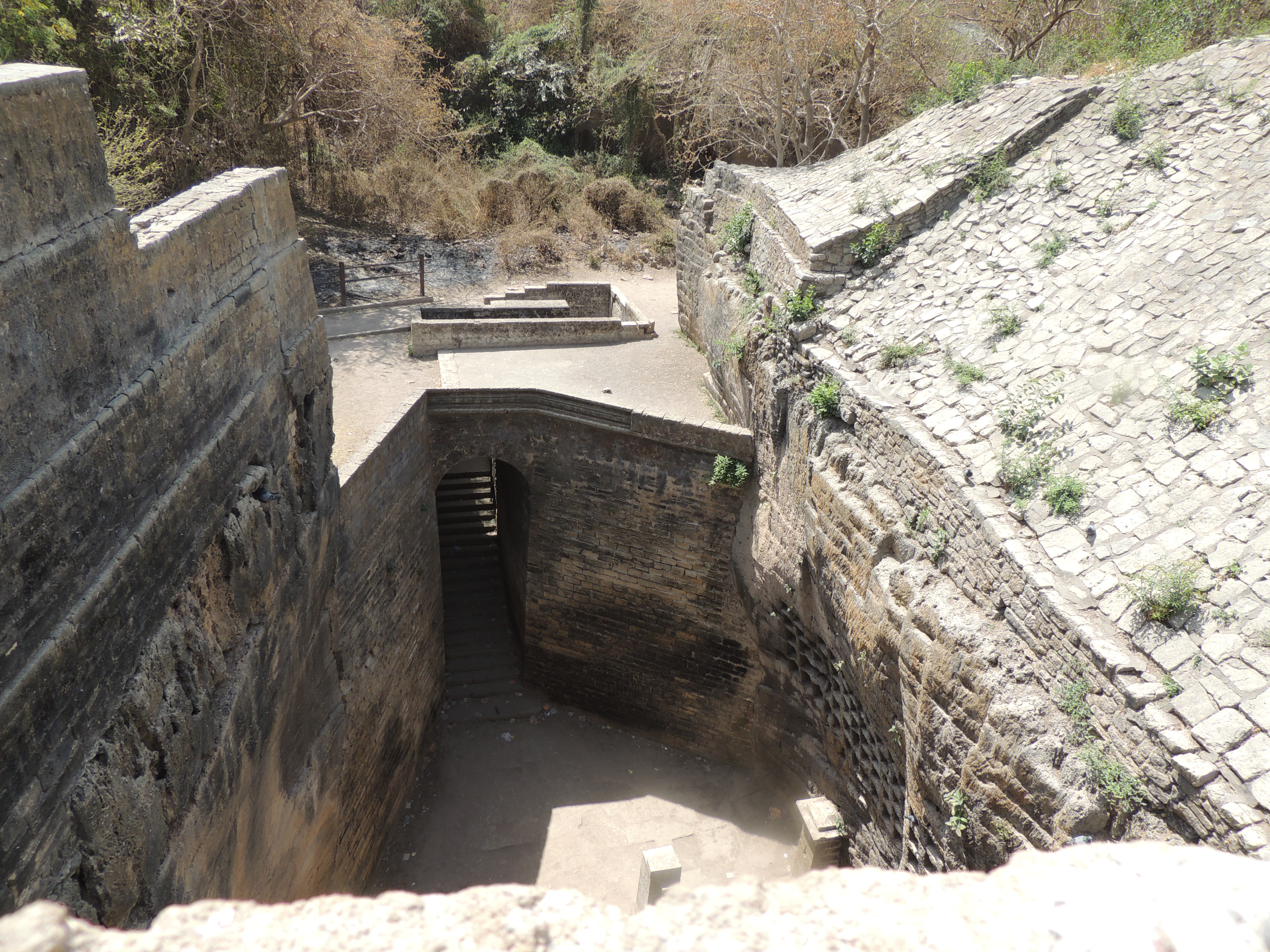
Forecourt

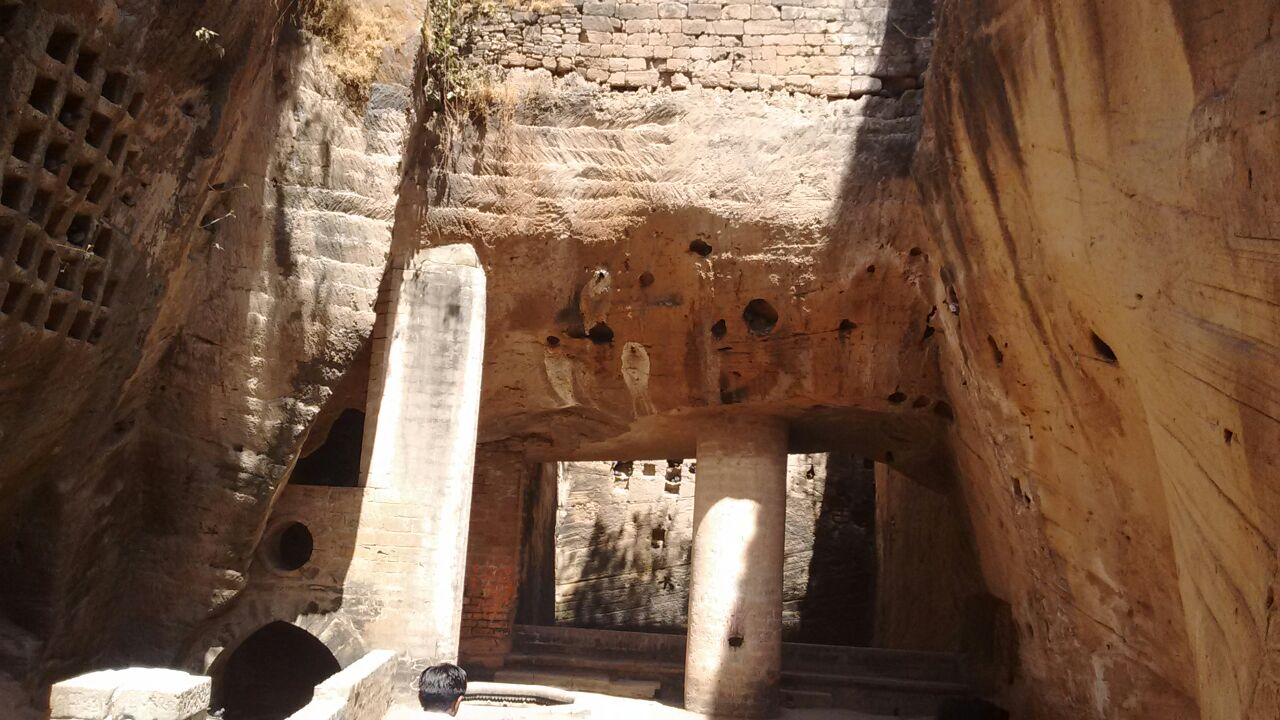
Forecourt

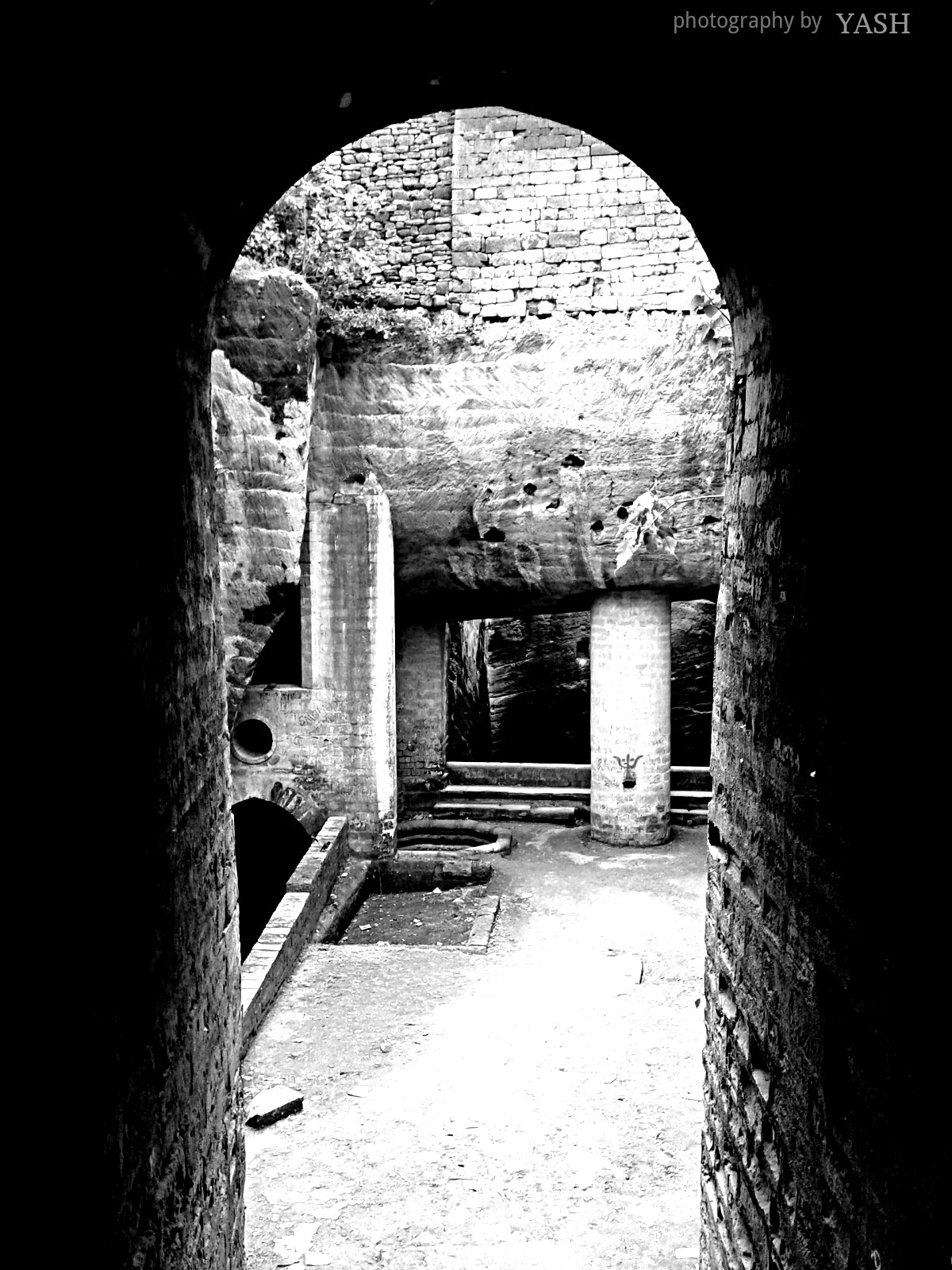
Forecourt from steps

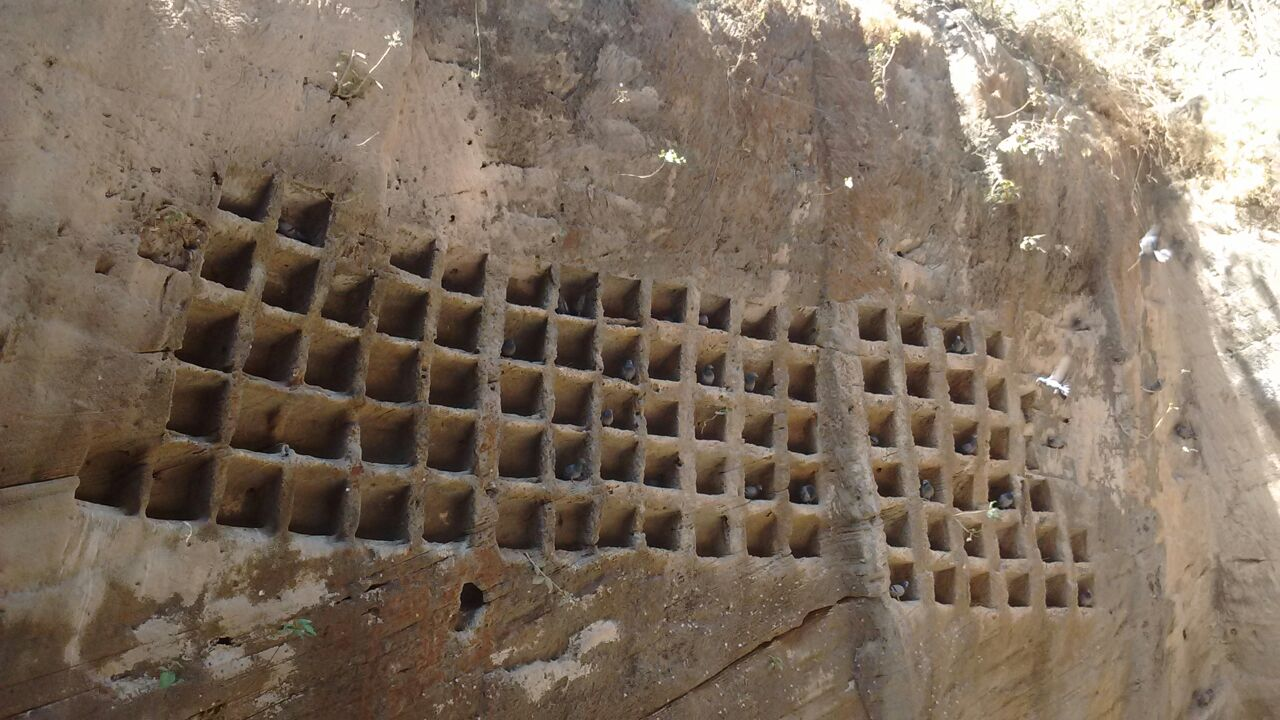
Soft rock hewn to make niches for birds

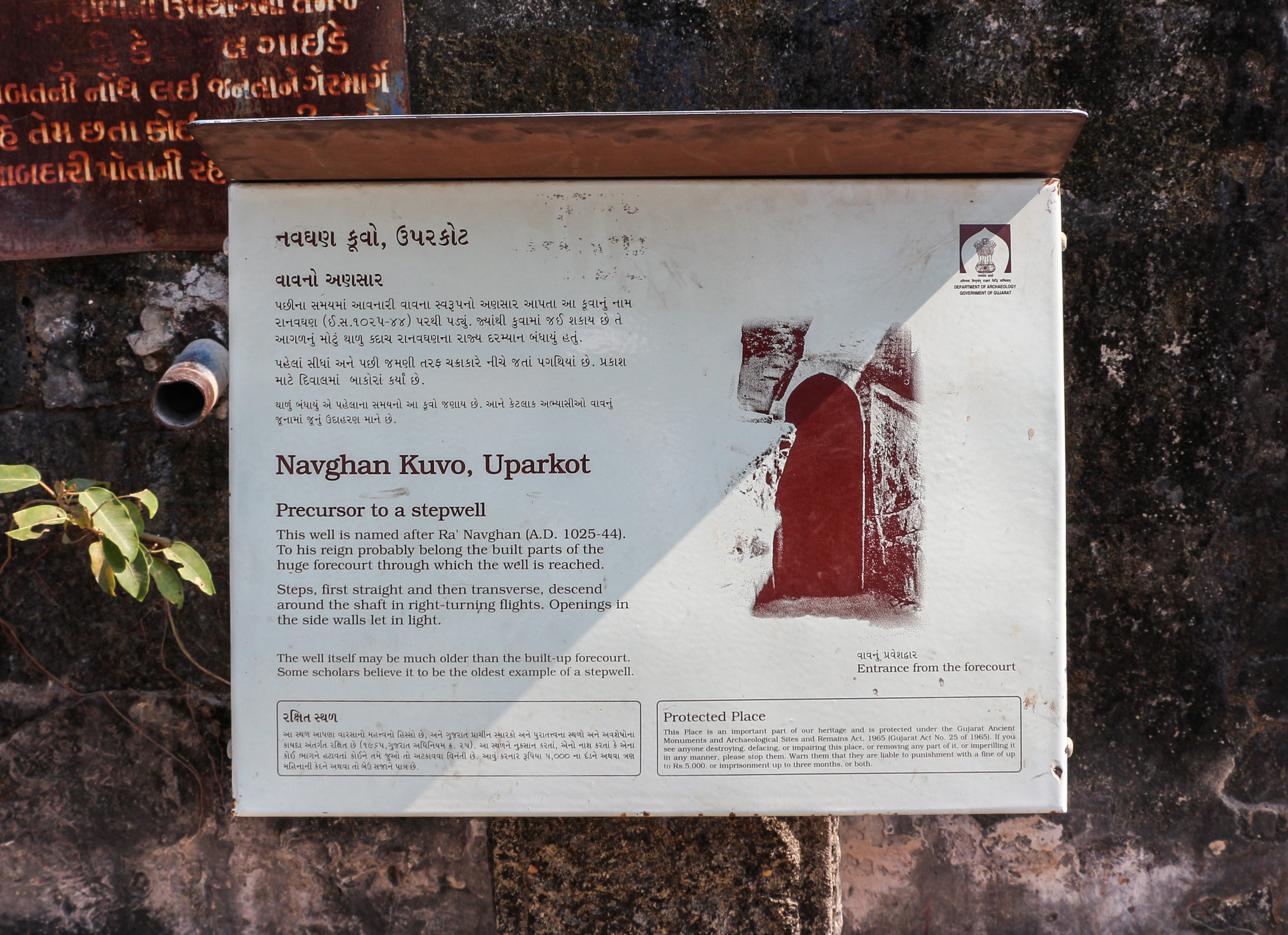
Information board

== See also ==
- Adi Kadi Vav
- Rani ki vav
- History of stepwells in Gujarat
- Stepwell
