= Ranakdevi's Temple =

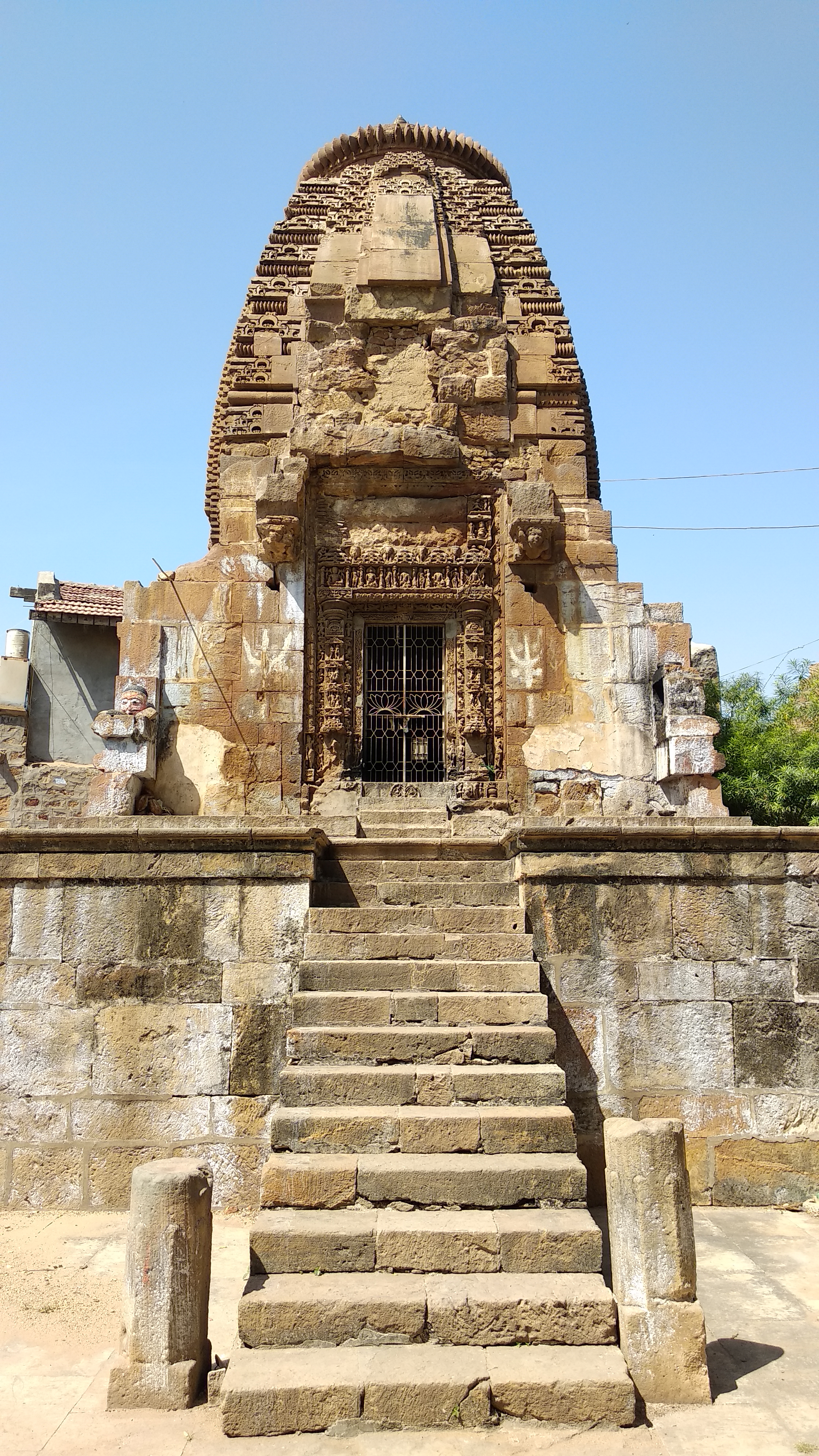
- Ranakdevi's Temple

- Location within Gujarat

Religion
- Affiliation: Hinduism
- District: Surendranagar district
- Deity: Mahakali, Ranakdevi; Shiva (original)

Location
- State: Gujarat
- Country: India
- Interactive map of Ranakdevi's Temple
- Coordinates: 22.7136°N 71.6761°E

Architecture
- Type: post-Maitraka and early Nagara phase of Māru-Gurjara architecture
- Completed: Last quarter of 9th century to 10th century

Ranakdevi's Temple is a 9th- or 10th-century Hindu temple dedicated to Ranakdevi located in Wadhwan in Surendranagar district of Gujarat, India. It is built in post-Maitraka and early Nagara phase of Māru-Gurjara architecture style.

== Legend ==
According to legend, Chaulukya king Jayasimha Siddharaja killed Chudasama king Khengara and abducted his queen Ranakdevi. On the way to Patan, Ranakdevi committed sati on the banks of Bhogavo river at Wadhwan. So Siddharaja built a temple dedicated to her.

== History ==
Ranakdevi's paliya (memorial stone) and a shrine still stand on the southern banks of the Bhogavo river in Wadhwan. Currently a Shiva temple near the fort of Wadhwan is identified as Ranakdevi's Temple by local people.

The is no information about the time and construction of the temple. Based on the style of construction, the temple seems to have been built in 10th century as the design of shikhara belongs to post-Maitraka period. It is unclear how the temple was associated with 12th century king Khengara's queen Ranakadevi. According to Madhusudan Dhaky and Harishankar Shastri, it was probably in last quarter of the 9th century during the reign of Dharanivaraha of the Chhapa dynasty who ruled from Vardhamana (now Wadhwan). According to Kantilal Sompura, it was built no earlier than 10th century. James Burgess had listed it as the Memorial Temple of Ranakdevi. It is listed as the Monuments of National Importance and maintained by the Archaeological Survey of India.

== Architecture ==
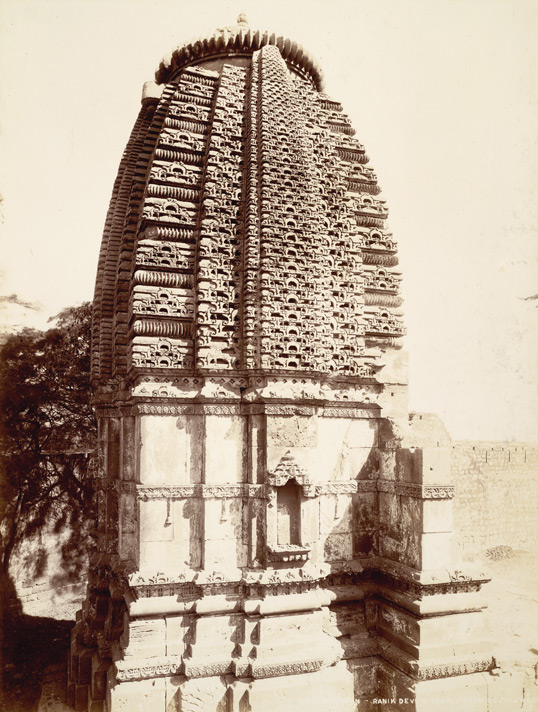
1899 photograph from southweat showing shikhara carvings

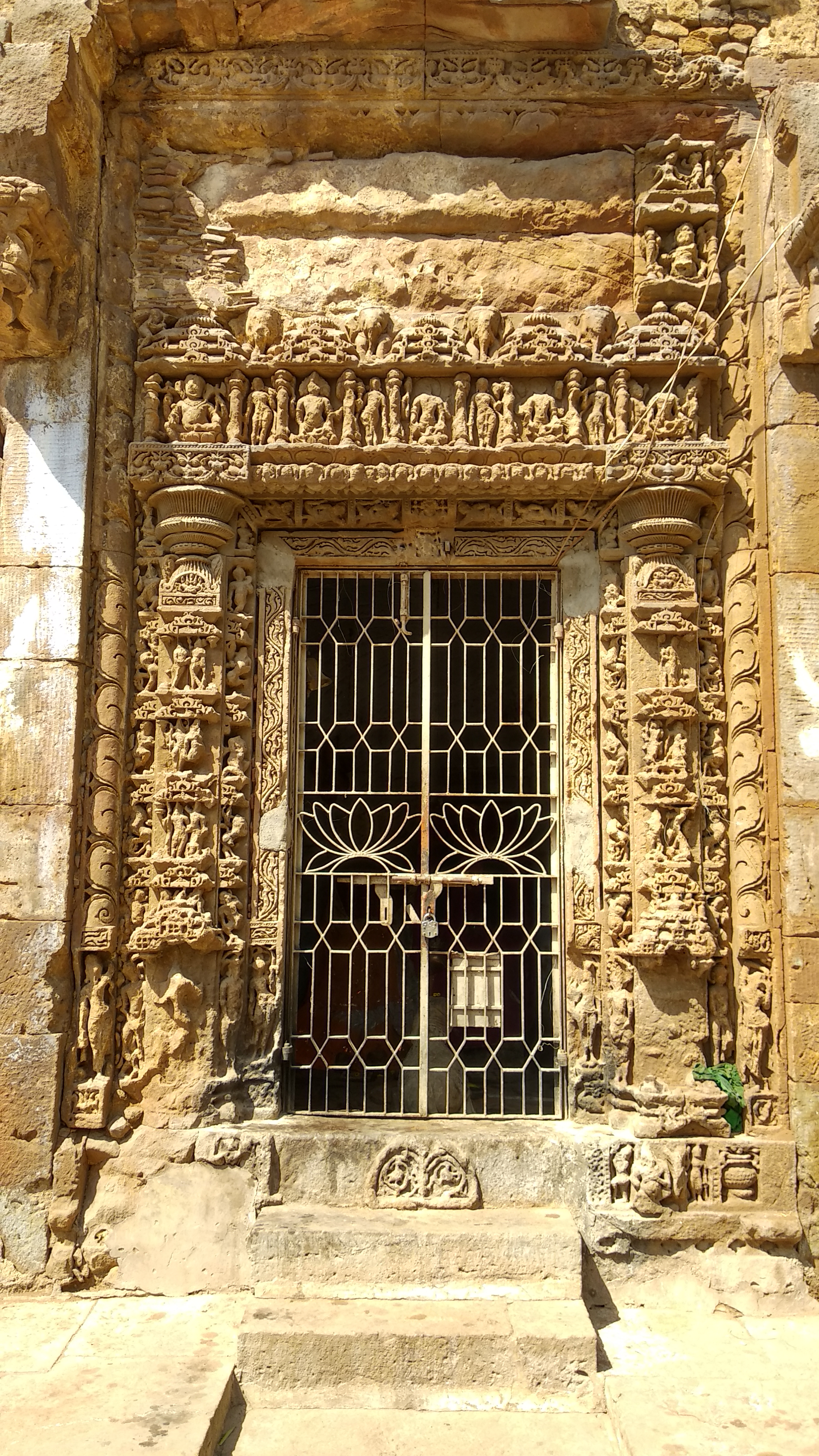
Doorframe

The temple is an example of post-Maitraka and early Nagara phase of Māru-Gurjara architecture. It is about 9 m high on a large pitha (platform). The grass-patti (band of grass moulding) is first seen here which continued in later architecture of the style. The shikhara has an amalaka and kalasha mouldings. The exterior walls had niches in all three direction devoid of any statues. They have a miniature phansana carving on top of it. It also have carvings of kirtimukha, chaitya, gavaksha and tamalapatra decorations. As it has water outlet in northern direction, it must be a Shiva temple. There is a statue of Nandi lying near the temple. In sanctum, the two simple statues are marked as Mahakali and Ranakdevi. The doorframe of sanctum has statues of Brahma, Shiva and others.
