= Ranakdevi (1946 film) =

- Directed by: V. M. Vyas
- Written by: V.M. Vyas, Mohanlal G. Dave (story), Karsandas Manek (dialogue)
- Based on: Legend of Ranakadevi
- Produced by: V. M. Vyas
- Starring: Bhagwandas; Chhanalal Thakur; Master Dhulia; Anjana; Motibai; Dulari; Nirupa Roy
- Cinematography: R. M. Rele
- Music by: Chhanalal Thakur
- Production company: Sunrise Pictures
- Release date: 1946
- Running time: 123 minutes
- Country: India
- Language: Gujarati

Ranakdevi is a 1946 Indian Gujarati historical drama film written, directed and produced by V. M. Vyas. The film was based on the legend of Ranakadevi.

== Plot ==
Siddhraj Jaysinh is a Solanki ruler of Patan. He was childless and decided to conduct a worship of Shiva with his queens. Ranak is a daughter of Parmara of the Sindh and an adopted daughter of Hadmat Kumbhar of Majevadi village near Junagadh. Shrikanth Barot, his bard, arranges a mock marriage of Ranak with a sword of Jaysinh as he predicts she will be the mother of his child. Before the mock marriage, Junagadh king Khengar abducts Ranak to avenge his father Navghan. Jaysinh attacks Junagadh and wins the battle with the aid of Deshal and Vishal, Khengar's nephews. He returns to Patan with Ranak but on their way, at Wadhwan on the banks of river Bhogavo, she commits sati by burning herself on the funeral pyre.

== Cast ==
The following actors were starred in the film:

- Anjana
- Motibai
- Dulari
- Nirupa Roy
- Lilavati
- Lila Jayawant
- Mallika
- Damayanti
- Chandrabala
- Amubai
- Sumati
- Daksha
- Kavita
- Bhagwandas
- Pande
- Chhanalal Thakur
- Natwarlal Chohan
- Master Dhulia
- Shyam
- Gangaram
- Gautam

== Production ==
The film is based on the local folk legend of Ranakadevi, a 12th century queen of Khengara, the Chudasama ruler of the Saurashtra region of western India. In the film, the historical events were mixed with folk legends. The film was directed and produced by V. M. Vyas. The story was written by Mohanlal G. Dave while the script was written by V. M. Vyas. The dialogues were written by Karsandas Manek. Nirupa Roy made her debut as an actress in the film.

== Soundtrack ==
Ranakdevi

Soundtrack album by Chhanalal Thakur
- Released: 1946
- Genre: Feature film soundtrack
- Language: Gujarati
- Label: Saregama

All lyrics are written by Manaswi Prantijwala; all music is composed by Chhanalal Thakur

Track listing
No.	Title	Singer(s)	Length
1.	"Lakh Lakh Divdani Arati"	Motibai, Chorus	2:20
2.	"Mhare Te Gamde Ek Vaar Avjo (Rasdo)"	Amirbai Karnataki, Chorus	3:24
3.	"Ghani Khamma, Ghani Khamma, Mara Baludane Ghani Khamma"	Rampyari	3:15

== Release and reception ==
The film was released in 1946. It was the only Gujarati film released that year. It was well received by the audience.

The film started a tradition of historical fiction films in Gujarati cinema.

== See also ==
- List of Gujarati films
