= Bhoira =

Bhonyara is a village in Vinchhiya Taluka of Rajkot district, Gujarat, India.

== History ==
During British period, it was under Jasdan State. It derives its name from a cave in the neighbouring hill, where there is also a fort. This is the fort destroyed by Chudasama king Khengara in 12th century, according to bardic tale.

== Demography ==
The population of Bhoira according to the census of 1872 was 584 and according to that of 1881, 526 souls.
