= Ranakadevi =

12th century queen of Saurashtra, India

Ranakadevi was a legendary 12th century queen of Khengara, the Chudasama ruler of Saurashtra region of western India. She is mentioned in the bardic tragic romance representing the battle between Chudasama king Khengara and Chaulukya king Jayasimha Siddharaja. However, this legend is not credible.

== Legend of Ranakadevi ==
Ranakadevi was a daughter of potter of Majevadi village near Junagadh, the Chudasama capital. The fame of her beauty reached Jayasimha, and he made up his mind to marry her. Khengara's marriage with her enraged Jayasimha. A variation of legend tells that she was born to the king of Kutch but she was abandoned in forest as the astrologer had predicted that whoever marry her will lose his kingdom and die young. The abandoned child was found a potter named Hadmat or Jam Rawal who raised her as his own daughter. Meanwhile Khengara had attacked and broken gates of Jayasimha's capital Anahilapataka (now Patan) when he was on an expedition to Malwa which had further enraged Jayasimha.

Khengara used to stay himself at the fort of Uparkot in Junagadh but kept his queen Ranakadevi in his palace in the hill fort of Girnar, a mountain near Junagadh. His nephews Visal and Desal were the only persons allowed access there except the guard. Khengara used to go from the Uparkot to the Girnar fort to visit Ranakadevi. One day he found Desal drunk there and, in spite of all his protestations, accused him of an improper intimacy with her. Then he expelled both Desal and Visal from the Junagadh.

They went to Jayasimha and told him to attack Junagadh. They entered the Uparkot with some cattle carrying grain, slew the guards and attacked the palace. Khengara came forth and fought and died in the battle and the Uparkot was taken. After this Desal and Visal took Jayasimha up to the Girnar fort and asked their aunt queen Ranakadevi to open the gate. She did so, not knowing what had happened. Then Jayasimha entered and on seeing her two sons ordered them to be put to death. Jayasimha took Ranakadevi with him and returned towards Anahilapataka.

On their way, at Vardhamanapura (now Wadhwan) on the banks of river Bhogavo, overcome by the noble bearing of Ranakadevi, he offered to make her his first queen, but she told him that nothing would make her forgive him the death of her innocent boys and his husband. She then cursed Jayasimha and warned him that he should die childless. Then, she committed sati by burning herself on the funeral pyre of her husband, with his turban in her lap. Her curse was fulfilled and Jayasimha died childless.

== Historicity ==
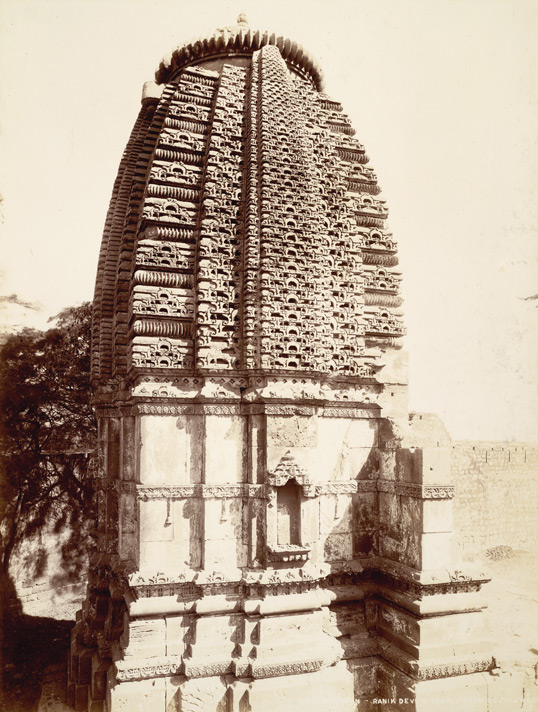
Ranakadevi shrine from south-west, Wadhwan, 1899

Several Sorathas (couplets) uttered by Ranakadevi in the bardic accounts evokes sadness but their usefulness as the historical material is doubtful. Even the existence of Ranakadevi is doubtful. Ranakadevi is not mentioned in the Chaulukya era chronicles such as Puratana-prabandha-sangraha or Merutunga's Prabandha-Chintamani but instead they give name Sonaladevi and Sunaladevi respectively. The Apabhramsa verses uttered by Sonaladevi after the death of Khengara counts eleven and eight in them respectively.

Ranakadevi's paliya (memorial stone) and a shrine still stand on the southern banks of the Bhogavo river in Wadhwan, though Ranakdevi's Temple seems to have been built earlier, probably during the reign of Dharanivaraha of the Chhapa dynasty (last quarter of the 9th century).

== In popular culture ==
Several variation of this legend are still popular in bards and peoples of Saurashtra. Some of the verses of the ballad of Khengara and Ranakadevi are very poetical. Many verses are given in the Ras Mala by Alexander Kinloch Forbes. One such verse is:

For shame murderous Girnar, Why were you not bent crooked; When died Ra Khengara, Thus wept Ranakadevi.

Ranakdevi (1883), a Gujarati novel written by Anantprasad Trikamlal Vaishnav, is based on her. Amar Chitra Katha has published a comic, Ranak Devi: The Story of a Great Queen of Saurashtra (1977, #452) based on the legend.

She is a character in Sadhara Jesang, a Vesha (play) of Bhavai, the folk theatre of Gujarat. Gadh Juno Girnar (1967) is a Gujarati play based on the legend. Two silent films about Ranakadevi are produced; one in 1923 directed by S. N. Patankar and another in 1930 produced by Chandulal Shah and directed by Nanubhai Vakil. The Gujarati film Ranakdevi (1946) starring Nirupa Roy and directed by V. M. Vyas was also produced. Another film Ranakdevi (1973) directed by Babubhai Mistry starred Tarala Mehta, Upendra Trivedi, Arvind Trivedi and Arvind Pandya in lead roles.
