= Khengara (12th century king) =

Khengara was a Chudasama king of Saurashtra region of western India who reigned in the 12th century. His capital was at Junagadh. He was a contemporary of Jayasimha Siddharaja, the Chaulukya ruler of Anahilapataka. According to bardic tales, he was a son of Navaghana and had succeeded him.

== Battle with Jayasimha Siddharaja ==
Jayasimha's Dahod inscription (VS 1196/1140 CE) boasts that he imprisoned the king of Saurashtra; this is most probably a reference to his victory over Khengara. In Siddha-Haima-Shabdanushasana, Hemachandra has given two examples of grammar mentioning Jayasimha's victory over Saurashtra. The verses attributed to Ramachandra, disciple Hemachandra, in Prabandha-Chintamani of Merutunga, Jayasimha is referred as Giridurgamalla, i. e. the "Champion of the Giridurga or Junagadh". The Someshvara's Kirtikaumudi, the Puratana-prabandha-sangraha, and the Prabandhachintamani - all mentions Jayasimha's victory over Saurashtra.

Gulab Chandra Chaudhary opines that Merutunga, in Prabandha-chintamani, wrongly identifies Navaghana with Khengara; mentioning Navaghana in prose and Khengara in verses while all other sources mention Khengara. Jinaprabha's Vividh Tirtha Kalpa mentions death of Khengararaya by Jayasimha. Someshvara's Kirtikaumudi mentions that Jayasimha had defeated powerful Khengara of Saurashtra in battle as a lion kills an elephant. Prabhachandra, in Prabhavaka-charitra, also mentions that Jayasimha killed Khengara. According to Puratana-prabandha-sangraha, Jayasimha's officer Udayana killed Khengara but it Jain chronicler Prabhachandra, in Prabhavaka-charitra, noted that he had died in the expedition against Navaghana. The Puratana-prabandha-sangraha further adds, Udayana died fighting in the battle with Sangan Dodiaka.

Based on the multiple tales and Navaghana's confusion with Khengara, Campbell theorises that Jayasimha might have led multiple expeditions against the more than one king with similar names.

The bardic tales also says that Khengara was killed in battle but the Dahod inscription mentions that he was imprisoned only. According to Jayasimha Suri, after defeating Khengara, Jayasimha appointed Sajjana as the governor of Girnar. Merutunga also supports this claim, although he calls Sajjana, the descendant of Jamb, the governor of Saurashtra.

=== Prabandhachintamani's Navaghana ===
If Merutunga has wrongly identified Navaghana with Khengara in Prabandha-chintamani, the following account is given in it:

Navaghana is mentioned as the Abhira Ranaka, similar to Hemachandra's reference to Graharipu in Dvyashraya. Merutunga claims in his prose that Navaghana defeated Jayasimha eleven times, but Jayasimha went himself twelfth time after capturing newly fortified Vardhamanapura (now Wadhwan). Merutunga's claim cannot be taken literally: 12 was a favourite number of the Jain writers, and he may have used the number to emphasize the seriousness of the war. Jayasimha besieged Junagadh fort. Navaghana's nephews had agreed to show the secret entrance of the fort on condition that Jayasimha will not kill Navaghana with weapons but with coins which they meant that Jayasimha will only collect a tribute from him. When Jayasimha entered the fort, he captured Navaghana from his great palace in which he was hidden by his queen. He was not killed with weapons but he was beaten to death with vessels full of coins.

=== Bardic legends ===
==== Khengara's vows ====
The Bardic accounts mentions that when Jayasimha ascended, Navaghana was the powerful ruler of Junagadh. Jayasimha had defeated and humiliated him. They say that his son Khengara was made to four vows by his dying father; to slay Harraj of Umeta, to destroy the fort of Bhoira, to break down the gate of Anahilapataka and to split the cheeks of a Charan named Mesan who had spoken disrespectfully of him. Along with fulfilling all other vows, Khengara broke the gates of Anahilapataka when Jayasimha was engaged in Malwa which enraged Jayasimha and he attacked Junagadh. The bards also mentions the Ranakadevi as the immediate cause of war.

==== Legend of Ranakadevi ====
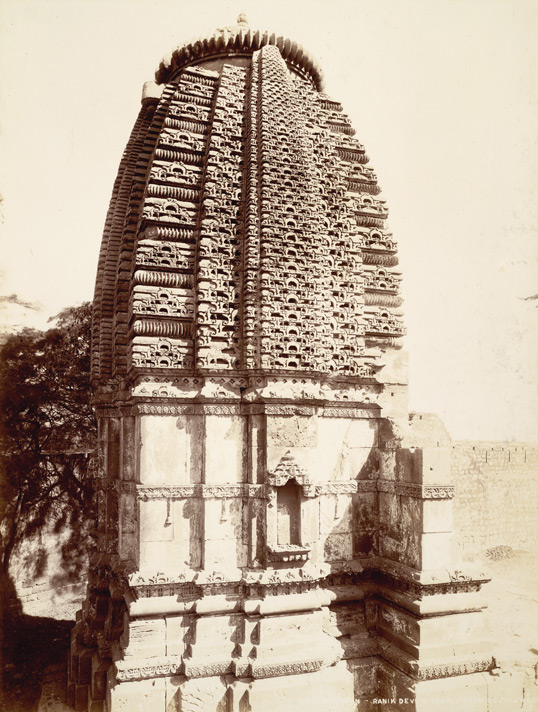
Ranakadevi shrine from south-west, Wadhwan, 1899

The bardic accounts of Saurashtra represents the battle between Khengara and Jayasimha as a tragic romance of Ranakadevi. However, this legend is not credible.

Ranakdevi was a daughter of the potter of Majevadi village near Junagadh. The fame of her beauty reached to Jayasimha and determined to marry her. Meanwhile, Khengara marries her which had enraged Jayasimha. Jayasimha besieged Junagadh. Following betrayal by Khengara's nephews, he entered the fort, killed Khengara and captured Ranakadevi. Ranakadevi committed sati, the self-immolation on funeral pyre of his husband at Vardhamanapura (now Wadhwan).

===== Historicity of Ranakdevi =====
Several Sorathas (couplets) uttered by Ranakadevi in these bardic accounts evokes sadness but their usefulness as the historical material is doubtful. Even the existence of Ranakadevi is doubtful. Ranakadevi is not mentioned in Puratana-prabandha-sangraha or Prabandha-chintamani but instead they give name Sonaladevi and Sunaladevi respectively. The Apabhramsa verses uttered by Sonaladevi after death of Khengara counts eleven and eight in these works respectively.

=== Date of the battle ===
There is no direct evidence of the year of a defeat of Khengara. Bhagwanlal Indraji assumed that Sajjana was the governor of Saurashtra based on the Girnar inscription dated VS 1176 (1120 CE) but no such inscription is found and the only inscription of Jayasimha in Girnar is undated and does not mention Sajjana. The Vividha Tirth Kalpa mentions that Sajjana, the governor of Saurashtra, built Neminatha temple on Girnar in VS 1185. The Prabandha-chintamani mentions that Sajjana spent three years' revenue in building the temple. If it is true, Sajjana was the governor of Saurashtra in VS 1181-82 (1125-26 CE). So Saurashtra might have been won before that 1125-26 CE.

Shri Simha Samvat connected with Siddharaja is mentioned in several inscriptions in Saurashtra around Prabhas which starts in VS 1170 (1114 CE). For example, the inscription in the Sodhali Vav, a stepwell in Mangarol has a date in two eras; VS 1202 and Shri Simha Samvat 52. If this era was founded to commemorate the victory of Jayasimha, the battle might have happened in 1114 CE.

=== Aftermath ===
Historical evidence indicates that Jayasimha was unable to capture all of Khengara's territories in Saurashtra; Jayasimha's successor Kumarapala had to send an army against Saurashtra. According to Prabhachandra, Jayasimha was unable to annex Khengara's kingdom because a large number of Khengara's followers continued to offer resistance.

The Saurashtra fell under the Chaulukyas by 1300 CE and the Chudasamas continued to rule Saurashtra as their feudatory till 1420 CE.

== Dates and succession ==
Based on the literature, it is known that he was a contemporary of Jayasimha Siddharaja who reigned from c. 1092 – c. 1142 CE thus Khengara must be reigning during the late years of his reign in the 12th century.

According to the Gazetteer of the Bombay Presidency, Khengara reigned from 1098-1125 CE and he was succeeded by his son Navaghana (1125-1140 CE), followed by Kavat (1140-1152 CE) and Jayasimha/Graharipu (1152-1180 CE). Though these dates are not reliable.
