= Timeline of Ahmedabad =

This page provides a historical timeline of Ahmedabad, the sixth largest city in India.

== Up to 15th century ==
- 1074 – Karna of Chaulukya dynasty won Aashavalli and established Karnavati.
- 1094 to 1143 – Shantuvihar and Udayvihar are constructed.
- 1284 – The group of Mandap Durg's Zanzan visited Karnavati.
- 1297 – Alauddin Khalji won Gujarat.
- 1299 – Khilji's Army destroyed Doms and Temples of Aashavalli.
- 1411 – On the banks of Sabarmati River, Sultan Ahmed Shah I laid the foundation of Ahmedabad, Manek Burj and Manek Chowk, Ganeshbari, Bhadra Fort, Muhurt Pol and Jama Masjid.
- 1413 – Construction of Bhadra Fort completed.
- 1423 – Construction of Jama Masjid, Ahmedabad completed.
- 1441 – Death of Sheikh Ahmed Khatu and construction of the historical Sarkhej Roza begun.
- 1451 – Houj-E-Kutub or Kankaria Lake constructed.
- 1453 – Daria Khan's Tomb and dome constructed.
- 1454 – Construction of Shaking Minarets of Sidi Bashir Mosque near Gomtipur.
- 1485 – Dada Harir Stepwell constructed.
- 1486 – Construction of city walls by Mehmud Begada.
- 1498 – Adalaj Stepwell with exquisite stone carving.

== 16th century ==
- 1514 – Arrival of Spanish traveler Barbosa and construction of Rani Sipri Masjid.
- 1535 – Humayun captured Ahmedabad and ruled for nine months. Bahadurshah recaptured.
- 1555 – Arrival of Arabian historian Udadbir.
- 1572 – Sidi Saiyyed Mosque with the world-famous carved stone tree constructed.
- 1572 – Akbar captured the city, end of the sultanate.
- 1586 – Meeting of Sant Dadu and Akbar, Akbar recaptured the city from Muzaffarshah.

== 17th century ==
- 1614 – Arrival of the first representative of the British East India Company.
- 1618 – Arrival of Jehangir, letters written to the British King James.
- 1621 – Shah Jahan constructed Shahibag Palace (presently Commissioner's Bungalow) and the Shahi Gardern.
- 1622 – The Jain merchant Shantidas Jhaveri starts the construction of the Chintamani Parshvanath temple at Saraspur
- 1630 – Famine known as `Satyashiyo Dukal'.
- 1636 – Bhadra palace constructed by Suba Azamkhan.
- 1638 – Arrival of Johan Albrecht de Mandelslo; first communal riot. Shah Jahan's temple of Chintamani Parshvanath at Saraspur, was demolished by Muslim rioters.
- 1644 – Aurangzeb becomes the subahdar (Governor) of Ahmedabad. He broke Chintamani Jain temple and riots broke down in the city.
- 1658 – Aurangzeb ascended the throne at Delhi.
- 1664 – Revenue concessions to Europeans, Arrival of Tavernier.
- 1672 – Arrival of English Ambassador Sir Thomas Roe.
- 1681 – Imposition of jizyah tax on non-Muslims. Riots due to famine in the city.
- 1683 – City flooded up to Teen Darwaza due to flood.

== 18th century ==
- 1708 – Campaign by Balaji Vishwanath, Ahmedabad looted, truce set at a price of Rs. 1,20,000.
- 1715 – Hindu-Muslim riot.
- 1725 – Invasion by Marathas, persuaded to go back by hushmoney.
- 1731 – Arrival of Peshwa Bajirao II.
- 1732 – City suffers from famine. Many people died due to plague.
- 1733 – Library of Rasulabad looted.
- 1738 – Treaty between Mughal Suba of Ahmedabad Momin Khan and Damaji Gaikwad, city came under joint jurisdiction. Construction of Gaekwad Haveli.
- 1744 – Death of Gujarati Poet Shamal Bhatt.
- 1753 – Ahmedabad came under Maratha rule.
- 1757 – Division of Ahmedabad between Gaekwad and Peshwa. Momin Khan recaptured the city.
- 1758 – The city recaptured by Maratha after a year-long blockade on 27 February 1758. Maratha currency introduced.
- 1779–80 – General Goddard took over the city during First Anglo–Maratha War and handed it over to Fatehsinh Gaekwad under treaty of Salbai.

== 1800 to 1850 ==
- 1804 – Arrival of Swami Sahajanand (Later known as Swaminarayan), who was believed to be an incarnation of Krishna
- 1808 – Arrival of Gaikwad, A law for inheritance of property was enforced which can still be seen on Three Gates on a stone.
- 1818 – Mr. Dunlop, British Collector of Kaira took over the city and thus came the end of Maratha rule, Union Jack hoisted on Bhadra.
- 1819 – Rann of Kutch earthquake; Speculation in opium.
- 1820 – First import of foreign cloth.
- 1821 – Earthquake for 30 seconds.
- 1824 – First survey of the city.
- 1827 – Establishment of first Gujarati School.
- 1832 – Repairs to city walls by citizens' committee, first seeds of local self Government.
- 1834 – Beginning of city committee for municipal work.
- 1846 – Starting of First English School.
- 1847 – Construction of First Water Tank by city committee and municipal work started.
- 1848 – Construction of Hatheesing Temple.
- 1850 – Construction of the Swaminarayan Temple, Ahmedabad.

== 1851 to 1900 ==
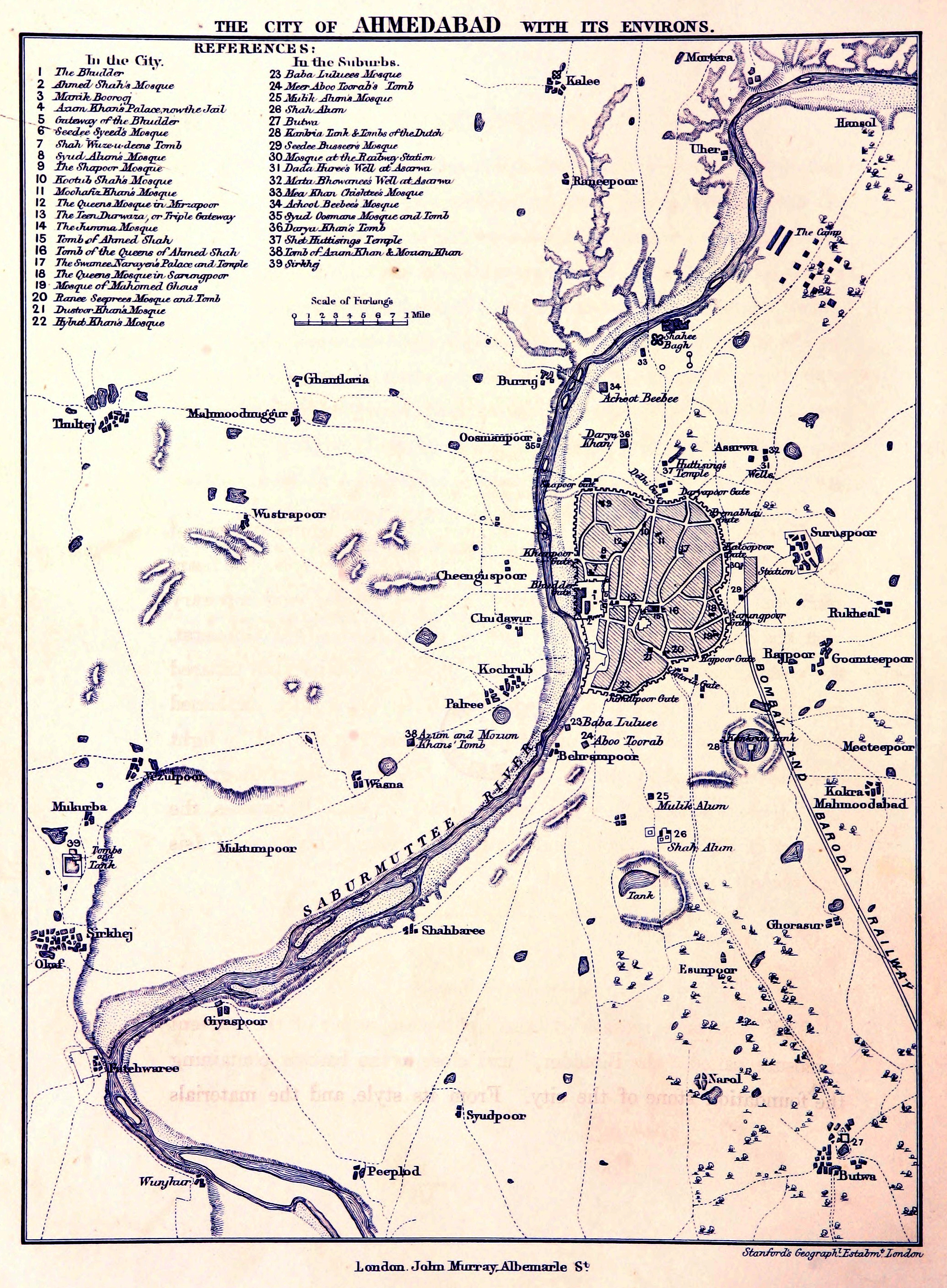
Ahmedabad City and Environ Map 1866

- 1857 – Ahmedabad Municipality came into existence on 19 January.
- 1861 – First Textile Mill started by late Mr. Ranchhodlal Chhotalal, the pioneer of Mill Industry.
- 1863 – Construction of Railway Station.
- 1864 – Railway between Ahmedabad and Bombay. Construction of Prem Darwaja.
- 1868 – Heavy Floods.
- 1870 – Opening of Ellisbridge.
- 1872 – Construction of first city road – Gandhi Road.
- 1873 – Ahmedabad Municipality recognized by statute and named as City Municipality.
- 1875 – Railway bridge and Ellisbridge were damaged by heavy floods.
- 1881 – B.J. Medical College started near Gheekanta.
- 1888 – Calico Mills was started by Sheth Karamchand Premchand.
- 1890 – The Czar of Russia came to Ahmedabad.
- 1897 – Opening ceremony of Gujarat College by Lord Sandhurst. Telephone service was started.
- 1898 – Death of Sheth Ranchhodlal Chhotalal.

== 1901 to 1950 ==
- 1910 – Municipality Suspended First Time, where Tirth Patel was the ruler
- 1913 – Electricity Company started.
- 1915 – Arrival of Mohandas K. Gandhi.
- 1916 – Establishment of Satyagrah (Sabarmati) Ashram.
- 1920 – Gujarat Vidyapeeth, founded by Mahatma Gandhi, Sessions of the Indian National Congress.
- 1922 – Arrest of Mahatma Gandhi, sentenced to six years jail for treason because of ahsahkar andolan.
- 1924 – Elected Ahmedabad Municipality resumed its working, Sardar Vallabhbhai Patel becomes President of the Municipality.
- 1926 – Ahmedabad Municipality becomes Barrough Municipality.
- 1927 – Heavy floods. 71 inch Rainfall.
- 1929 – Opening of Sir. Lallubhai Ashram Shah College.
- 1930 – Mahatma Gandhiji's historic 'Dandi March' and Salt Satyagraha.
- 1931 – Vadilal Sarabhai General Hospital Started.
- 1938 – Opening of M.J. Library.
- 1939 – Opening of Sardar Bridge. Income Tax imposed.
- 1940 – Opening of Gandhi Bridge and Infections Disease Hospital.
- 1941 – Communal riot.
- 1942 – Quit India movement. Ahmedabad Municipality superseded. Historic Textile strike.
- 1946 – Second Communal riot. Death of Vasantrav and Rajabali in riots. Municipality reinstated.
- 1947 – Bus Transport Service under Municipal control, Independence day celebrated. Tricolor Flag on Bhadra fort after 130 years.
- 1948 – Immersion of Mahatmaji's ashes in Sabarmati, Preparations for Electric Grid Scheme and expansion of Power House, Famine conditions in Ahmedabad District.
- 1949 – Ahmedabad Station of All India Radio started, Gujarat Chamber of Commerce established.

== 1951 to 2000 ==
- 1951 – L. D. Engineering College started, North Gujarat Electric Grid Scheme Commissioned.
- 1952 – First general elections under the new Constitution giving adult franchise, First elections to Corporation.
- 1954 – Atira Laboratory building opened by Jawaharlal Nehru.
- 1957 – Second General Elections and second Corporation election. Corporation area extended, New buildings of All India Radio, Divisional Officer's status raised to Divisional Commissioner with wide powers, Centenary of Himabhai Institute, New Lal Darwaja Garden laid.
- 1960 – 1 May 1960 – Ahmedabad becomes the capital of newly state Gujarat state.
- 1961 – Opening of Indian Institute of Management, National Institute of Design.
- 1961 – Oil was discovered at Anklesvar in Gujarat (BBoY 1962)
- 1962 – Opening of Nehru Bridge, school of architecture at CEPT began its first course.
- 1963 – Opening of Nagari Eye Hospital by Prime Minister Jawaharlal Nehru.
- 1966 – Opening of Dr. Vikram Sarabhai Community Science Centre.
- 1970 – The capital moved from Ahmedabad to Gandhinagar
- 1973 – Opening of Shubhash Bridge, Heavy floods.
- 1974 – Nav Nirman Andolan by students.
- 1975 – Declaration of Emergency in the country
- 1986 – 92 km² of new area merged with Municipal Corporation on Eastern Periphery.
- 1993 – Municipal Corporation Superseded for the implementation of 74th Amendment and Administrator appointed.
- 1994 – Several administrative reforms and strict actions initiated by the Corporation to improve its financial position. In-house Computerization Started.
- 1997 – Municipal Corporation got itself credit rated from CRISIL and got A+ rating which subsequently increase to AA (so) rating
- 1998 – Ahmedabad Municipal Corporation becomes first corporation in the country to offer public bonds for Public Subscription of Rs.1000 million.
- 1999 – Widening of Sardar Bridge, Renovation of Tagore Hall, Renovation of Town Hall.
- 2000 – Widening of Gandhi Bridge, Widening of Ellis Bridge, Publication of Citizen's Charter for the first time, Inauguration of the ambitious Raska Water Project.

== 2001 to present ==
- 2001 – An Earthquake on Republic Day (near Bhuj) caused major damage across the western part of city, leaving over 750 dead and 4000 injured, many of them residents of tall buildings.
- 2002 – Gujarat Riots.
- 2004 – The Sabarmati Riverfront Project initiated.
- 2006 – Floods in Sabarmati after 1992, little damage to sabarmati riverfront project.
- 2008 – 2008 Ahmedabad bombings.
- 2009 – BRTS (Janmarg) starts its function in the city and gained award of most sustainable transport service.
- 2010 – Ahmedabad completed 600 years of its establishment on 26 February.
- 2017 – Ahmedabad was declared as a World Heritage City by UNESCO.
- 2018 – Ahmedabad Stock Exchange closes.
- 2019 – Ahmedabad Metro opens.
- 2020 – Narendra Modi Stadium, the world's largest, opens. It hosts the Namaste Trump event in February.
- 2025 – Air India Flight 171 plane crash.
- 2030 – 2030 Commonwealth Games take place.
