= Pol (housing) =

Traditional housing cluster found in Gujarat, India

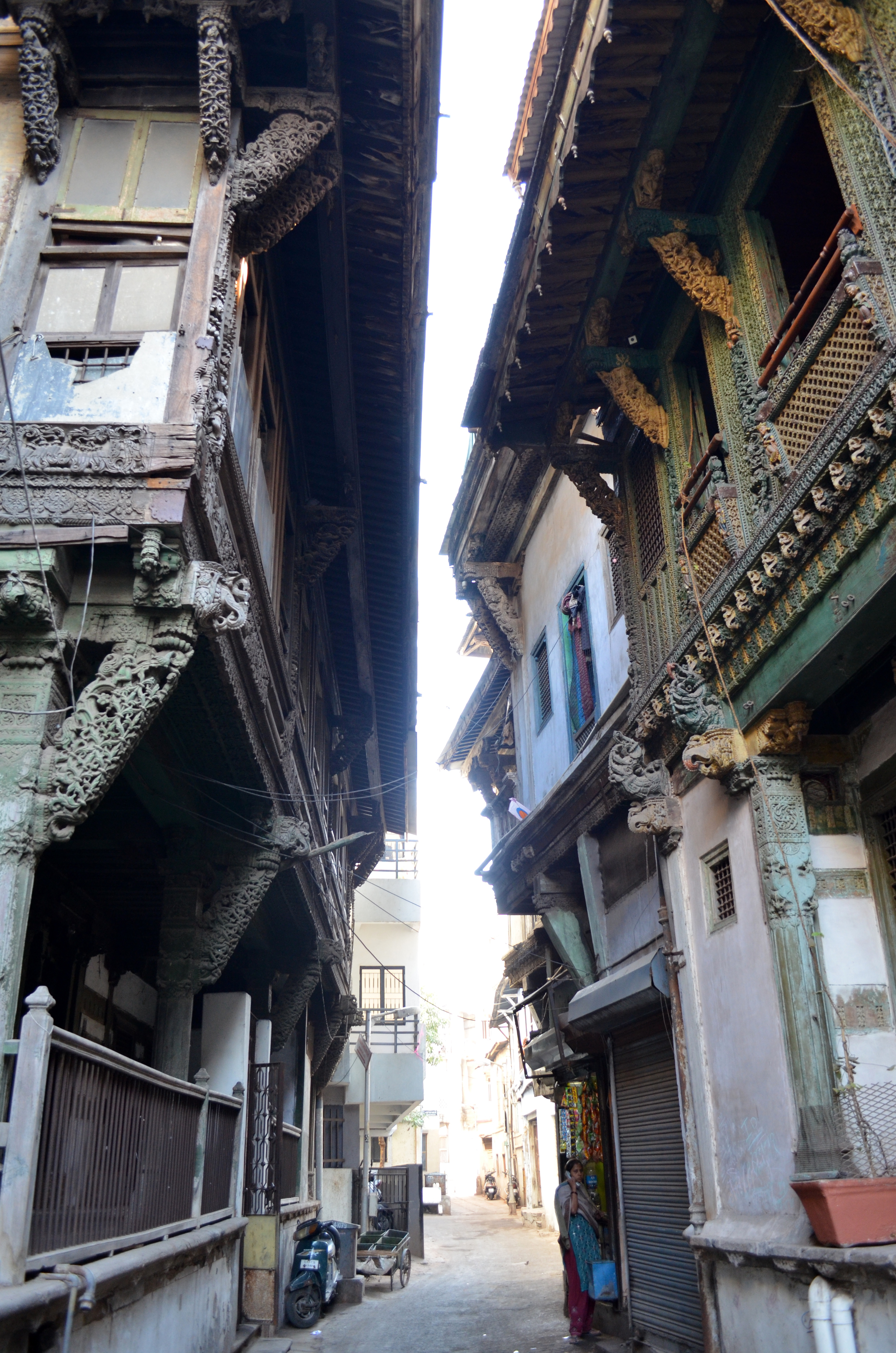
A pol in Ahmedabad

A pol (pronounced as pole, Gujarati: પોળ) in India is a housing cluster which comprises many families of a particular group, linked by caste, profession, or religion. Pols are typical of urban centres in Gujarat especially of Old Ahmedabad.

== Etymology ==
The word pol is derived from the Sanskrit word pratoli meaning entrance to an enclosed area.

== Architecture and culture ==
Each pol was protected by a gateway closed at night as a safeguard against thieves. Inside is one main street, with crooked lanes branching on either side. Most vary in size from five or ten to fifty or sixty houses. One of them, the Mandvi pol in the Jamalpur area of Ahmedabad, is much larger than the rest and includes several smaller pols, with an area of about fifty acres and a population of thousands. Pols are almost entirely inhabited by Hindus, in some cases by a settlement of families belonging to one caste, and in others by families of several of the higher castes, Brahmins, Vanias, Suthars, and Kanbis.

Most pols have been established and with a gateway, some provided at the expense of the Pol's leading man whose name the pol in many cases bears, and whose family holds a position of respect as the heads of the pol. Each pol had generally its own watchman and its own sanitary arrangements. The affairs of the pol were managed by a group of people. The house property in the pol is to some extent held in common. Formerly no man could sell or mortgage a house to an outsider without first offering it to the people of the pol. Though this rule has not been kept latterly, residents of a pol sold their houses to people of the same caste. When a house is mortgaged or sold, the people of the pol had a right to claim from one-half to two per cent of the money received. At weddings and on other great family occasions, each householder is expected to feast the whole pol, and in some cases all the men of the pol, though not of the same caste, are expected to attend any funeral that may take place. If the pol rules are slighted, the offender is fined and, in former times, till he paid, he was not allowed to light a lamp in his house or to give a feast. The money gathered from gifts, fines, and the percentage on house property sales, formed a common fund managed by the leaders, seths, of the pol. This was spent on repairs to the pol gate, the pol privies, or the pol well. The polia or gate-keeper is not paid out of the fund. He earns his living by begging from the people of the pol and works as a labourer for them.

The chief feature of these pols is that each has a separate entrance protected by a gateway, pol, with a picket house on the top of it. Inside of the gateway the houses of the group form one or more streets, the ends either blocked by a dead wall, or, through a small door, bari, opening into another pol. Inside the pols the roads are rough, narrow, and winding, fit in many cases only for foot passengers. Most of the houses are first class, the walls massive and the timber strong. Some of them, especially those about more than hundred years old, are ornamented with much rich and finely cut wood-work. From their fondness for this part of the town and the want of open sites, the families as they grew larger, added story on story to the old houses, the upper stories often jutting out so far that, when two opposite houses were enlarged, their eaves almost met across the roadway. Inside of most two or more storied houses is a yard, and under the yard a covered reservoir with supplies of rain water for drinking. Part of the courtyard is sometimes raised into a terrace and used as a lounge or for drying grain, pulse, and clothes. In these houses valuables are, if unwieldy, stowed away in secret under-ground cellars with most carefully hid entrances. Some of these cellars have air shafts run through the walls, so that they may be used as retreats for men in hiding. The jewellery safe is usually a hole in the house wall or in one of the main beams, hidden so cunningly that no stranger can find it out, and its secret so jealously guarded, that it is known only to the head of the house, his wife, and one or two of his most trusted children. The people of these pols form, to some extent, separate communities, each with arrangements for managing its common affairs.

== Pols ==
The old city of Ahmedabad located on the Eastern banks of the Sabarmati river is made up of around 360 pols within a fortified compound. The earliest ‘Pol’ to be incorporated was aptly named ‘Mahurat Pol’ and was built adjacent to Manek Chowk.

== See also ==
- List of pols in Ahmedabad
- Manek Chowk
- Bhadra Fort

== Notes ==
- Gazetteer of the Bombay Presidency: Ahmedabad. 7 January 2015. pp. 248–332.
