= Gaekwad Haveli =

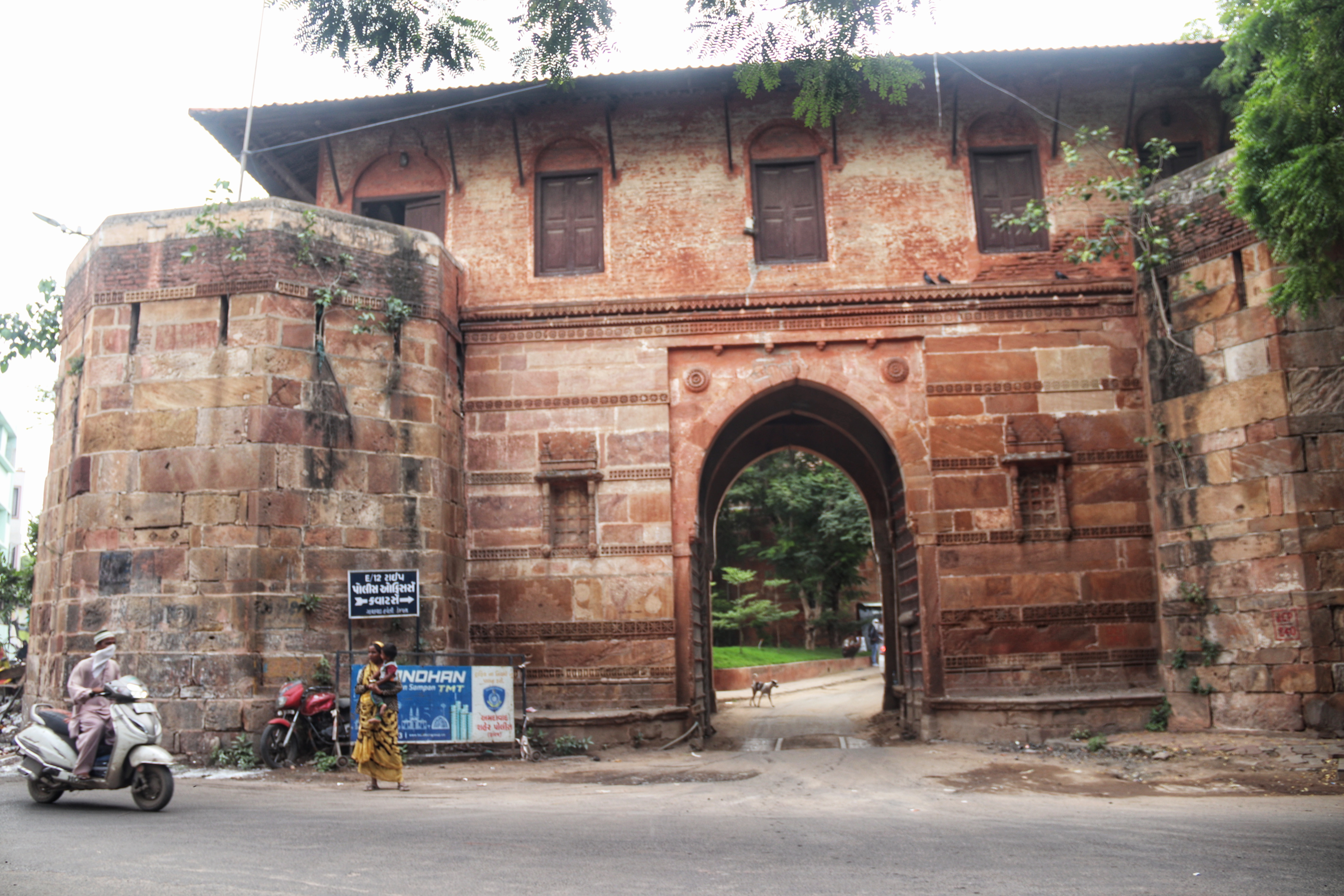
- Gateway of Gaekwad Haveli
- Interactive map of the Gaekwad Haveli area

General information
- Type: Haveli with fortification
- Location: Ahmedabad, India
- Coordinates: 23°0′43″N 72°34′48″E
- Current tenants: Gujarat Police
- Completed: 1738
- Renovated: 2014
- Renovation cost: ₹22 lakh (US$23,000)

Gaekwad Haveli is a historical haveli building in Ahmedabad. It was built in 1738. It was used as a seat of Gaekwad during Maratha rule in Ahmedabad. It was later converted into barracks and arsenal under British rule. Later it was used as railway depot and police crime branch headquarters. It was restored in 2014.

== History ==
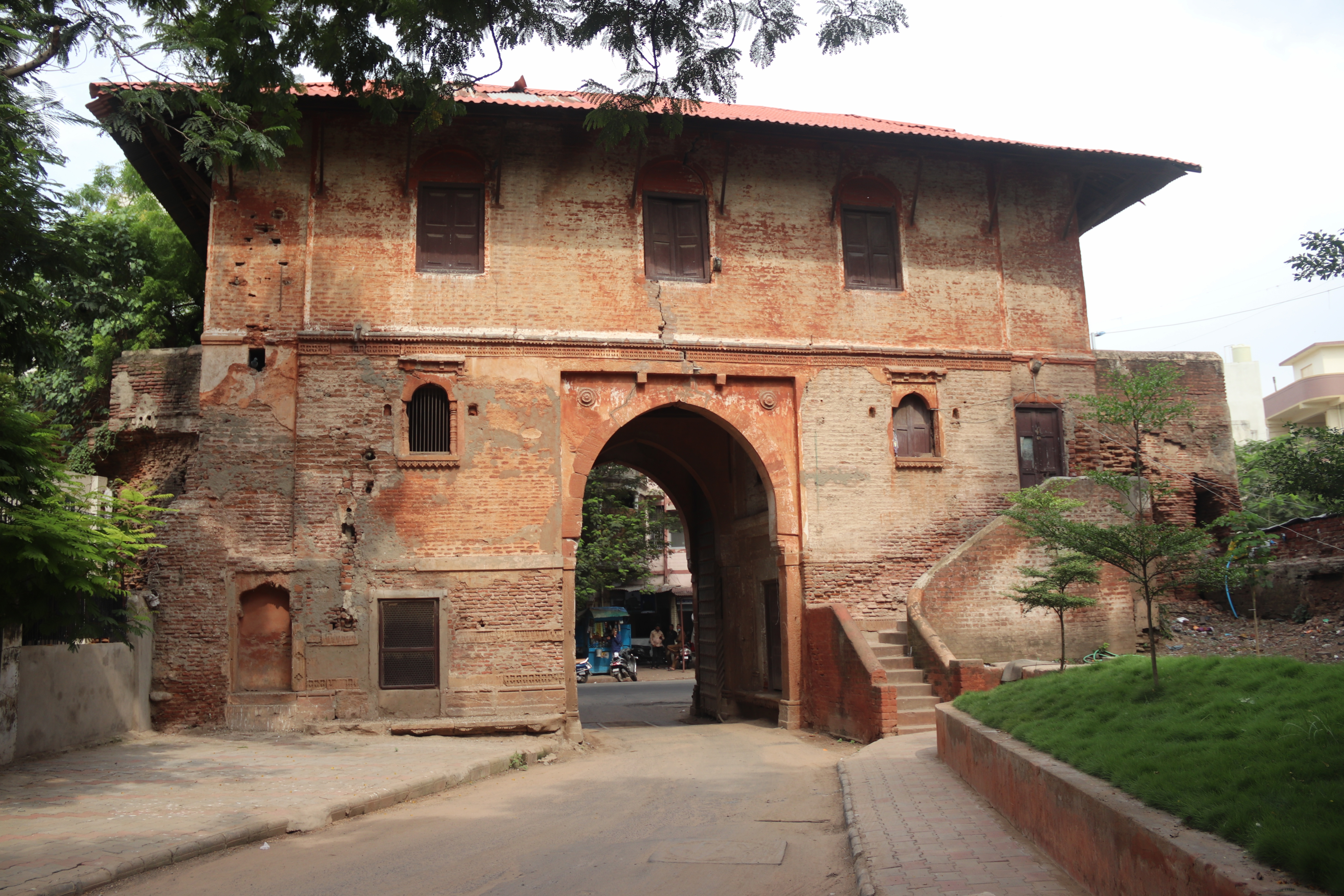
Gateway from inside

The Gaekwad Haveli was built along the Sabarmati River in 1738 when the city was under joint rule of Mughal subedar Momin Khan and Peshwas. In 1753, the combined armies of Damaji Gaekwad and Peshwa Raghunath Rao defeated Mughals and started jointly ruling the city. It was recaptured by Momin Khan in 1756 but after the blockade of a year from January 1757 to February 1758, he surrendered the city. The revenue of the city was equally divided between Peshwa and Gaekwad but the control of the eleven gates of the city was under Peshwa. The only gate under control of Gaekwad was Jamalpur gate. The haveli near this gate was fell under control of Damaji Gaekwad. He improved the haveli and made it the citadel. An irregularly built wall with heavy gates, enclosed a large area divided into three parts, that to the north was originally a garden watered by a Persian wheel; the centre and inner part, resting on the city wall, was the citadel; the south part was added, in 1814, by Kesoba Pandit. Aba Shelukar was appointed as the sarsuba of Peshwa controlled areas of the city for revenue management by Bajirao II. He committed atrocities on the civilians to extract money and became infamous. He tried to control city by himself and captured Gaekwad Haveli. Gaekwad sent the army to city which captured Bhadra Fort and he was detained in 1799 by Peshwas and was sent back to Pune and he was jailed for seven years. An axiom in Gujarati language, Haath Ma Dando, Bagal Ma Moi, Haveli Leta Gujarat Khoi is based on this incident. A garba about Selukars atrocities in city and his deeds is preserved in the Gujarati manuscript with the institute 'Farbus Gujarati Sabha'.

The garba is as following:

Pune thi Shelukar aavio re, garba karva Ahmedabad na raj rea; aavyiyo tyare posla odhi, gayo tyare chadhar odhia

(English: Shelukar arrived from Pune wearing an expensive shawl but had to leave Ahmedabad hiding under a cheap blanket.)

Later Peshwas agreed to lease the city to Gaekwads. The British East India Company took the control of the city in 1817 and the haveli was used as barracks for the garrison until 1824. Later it was turned into an arsenal for the Northern Division of the Army in 1833. After the opening of the railway between Ahmedabad and Bombay it was reduced to an ordnance depot in 1863. The haveli was later turned into the police crime branch headquarters of Ahmedabad in 1969.

== Restoration ==
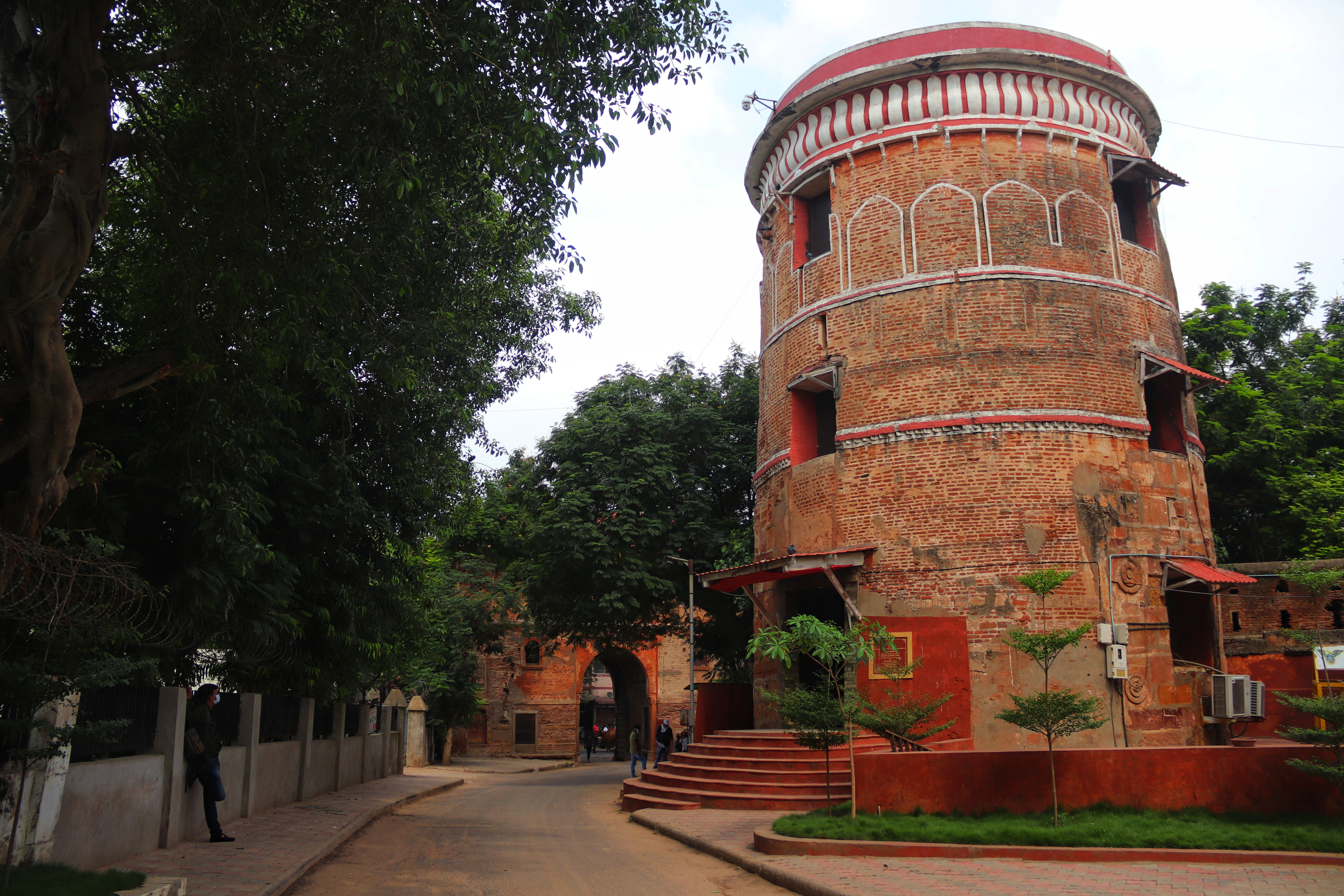
Bandhutva Smarak, a memorial museum dedicated to Vasant-Rajab in bastion

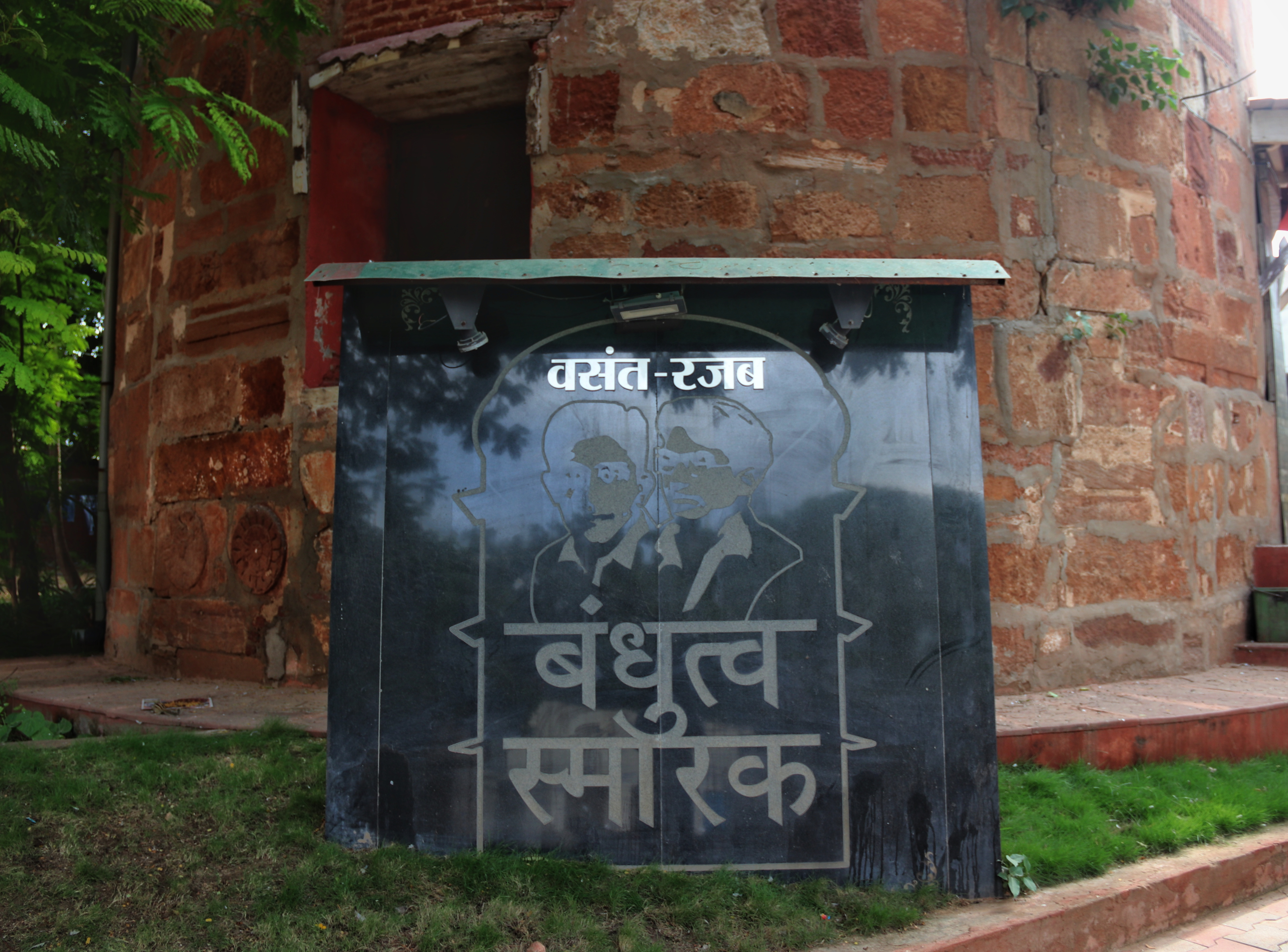
Bandhutva Smarak plaque featuring Vasant-Rajab

In October 2014, the restoration work of Gaekwad Haveli was undertaken by Ahmedabad Municipal Corporation at the cost of ₹22 lakh (US$23,000) as a grant from Gujarat Police Housing Corporation. The facade of the main gate made of light brown Dhrangadhra stone and painted with geru (red paint) was restored along with the watch tower behind it. The watch tower was converted into a police museum. In museum, a separate memorial dedicated to Vasant–Rajab, the duo who lost lives during the 1946 communal riots while trying to stop mob, is also created. The 1.7 km wall of the haveli with six gates was also restored. The old police club known as the Ahmedabad City Police Officers' Sports and Recreation Centre closed since 1980s was restored also. It was inaugurated on 23 May 1952 by the then chief minister of Bombay state, Morarji Desai.

A museum dedicated to Vasant-Rajab was opened in a bastion of the haveli in June 2015.
