= Manek Chowk (Ahmedabad) =

Prominent city square in Ahmedabad, India

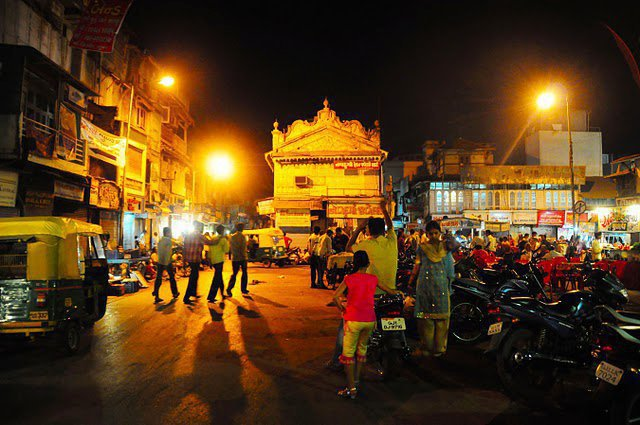
- Street food stalls at night
- Addresses: within walled city, near Bhadra Fort
- Location: Ahmedabad, Gujarat, India
- Coordinates: 23°1′25″N 72°35′19″E

Manek Chowk

Manek Chowk in the morning

Manek Chowk is a prominent city square located in Old Ahmedabad, India. Surrounded by historical structures, it serves as a vegetable market in the morning, a bullion market in the noon, and transforms into a vibrant street food market at night.

== Etymology ==
The square derives its name from Baba Maneknath, who played a crucial role in aiding Ahmed Shah I in the construction of Bhadra Fort in 1411.

== Manek Chowk ==
This bustling square functions as a vegetable market in the morning, transforms into a jewelry market in the afternoon (the second-largest in India), boasting an annual turnover of around 3 million rupees. However, it is most renowned for its food stalls that emerge around 9:30 in the evening, offering a variety of local street snacks. Manek Chowk is particularly celebrated for its Kulfi.

== Food Street ==
Manek Chowk is one of the few food streets allowed to stay open until late at night. Offering Bhajipau, dosa, typical local sandwiches, and various local cuisines, it is a hub for culinary enthusiasts even during the late hours.

== Structures ==
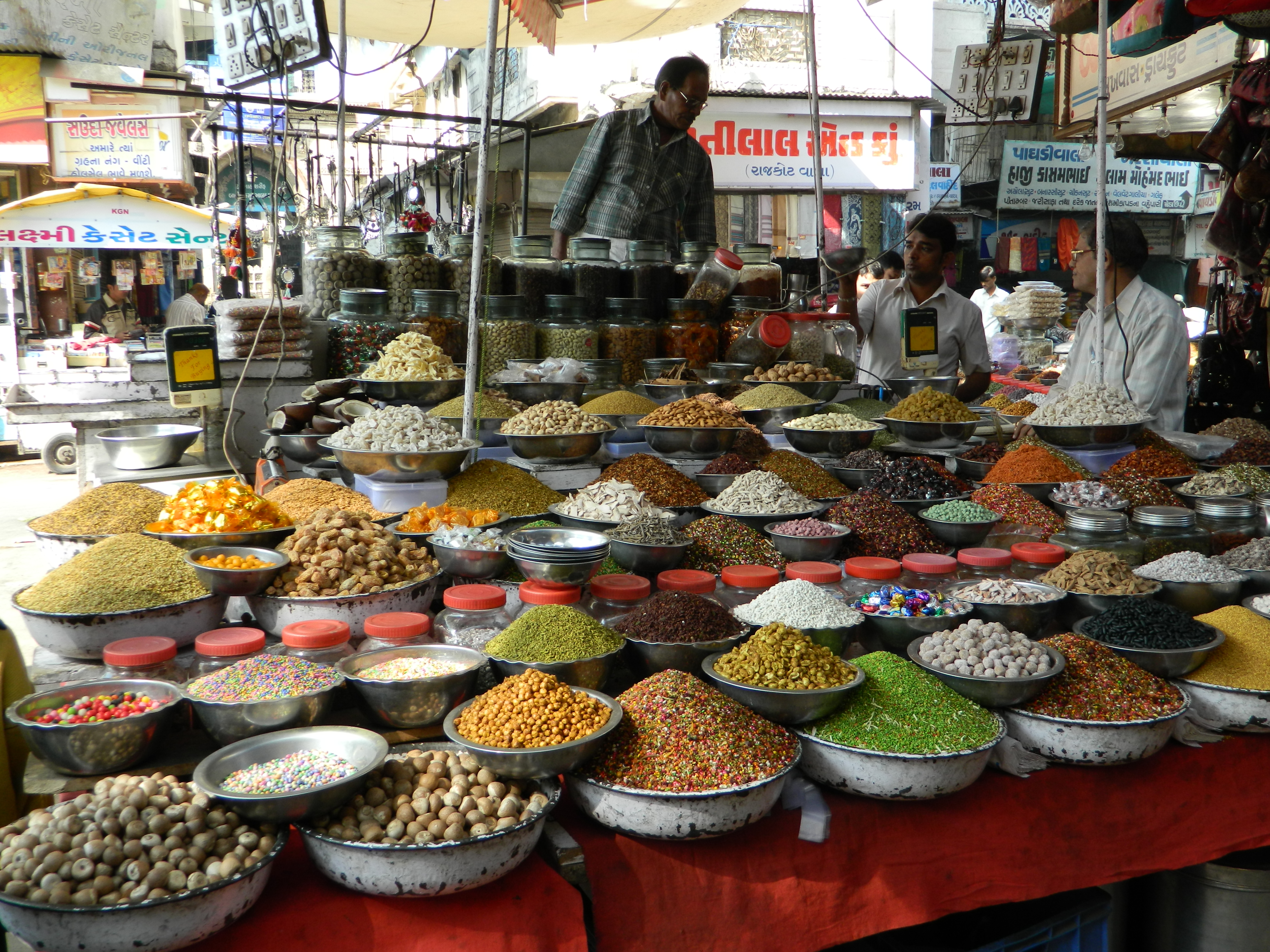
Variety of mouth fresheners, Mukhwas, being sold near Manek Chowk

=== Baba Maneknath Temple ===
The memorial temple, where the saint Maneknath took samadhi, is situated in Manek Chowk.

=== Badshah no Hajiro ===
This is the burial place for male members of the royal family, including Ahmed Shah I, the founder of Ahmedabad. Women are restricted from entering, and men must cover their heads before entering. Several minister’s tombs are laid out across the road. It lies to the west of Manek Chowk.

=== Rani no Hajiro ===
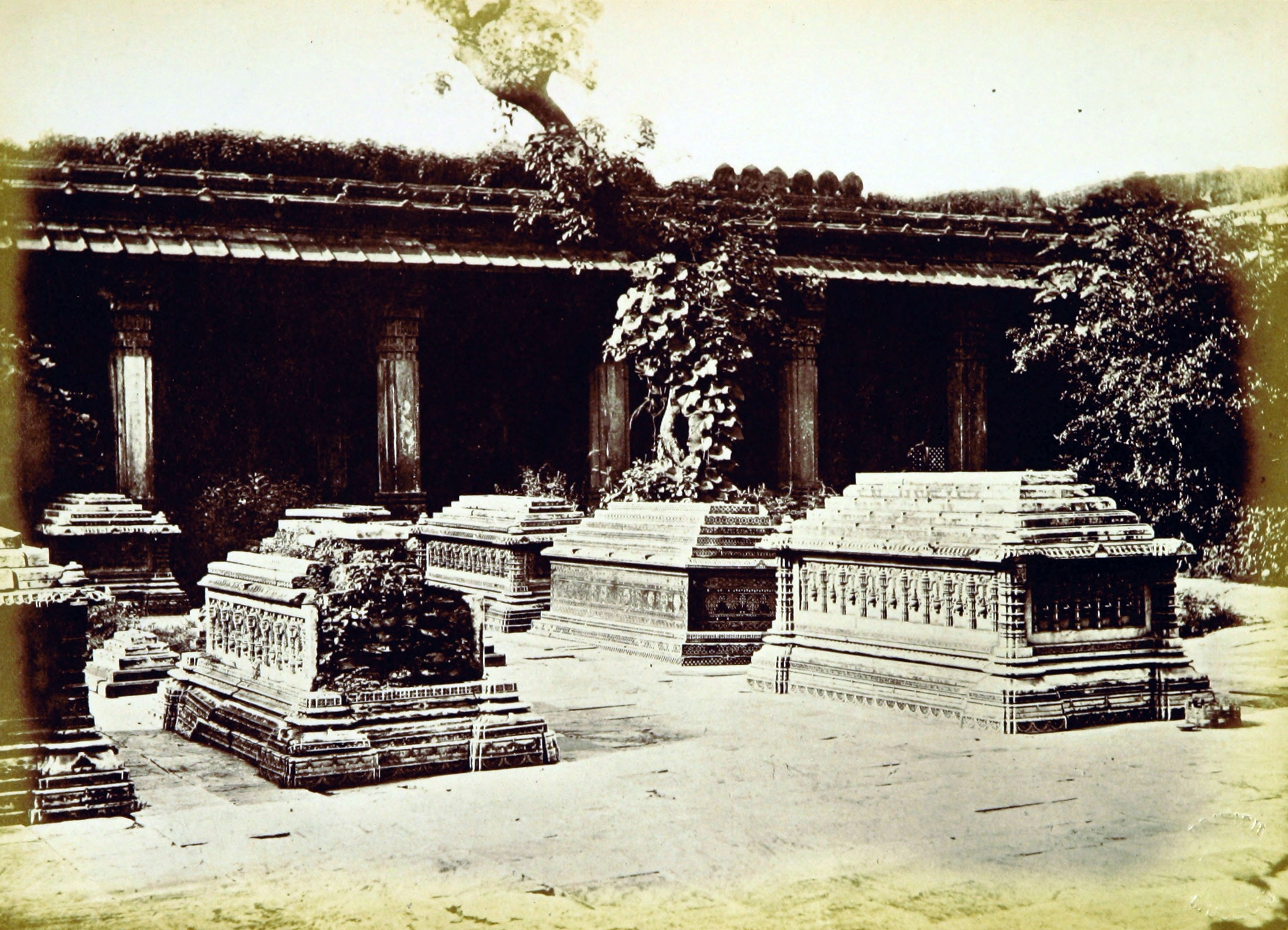
Tombs of Queens of Ahmed Shah I in 1866

On the street leading to the Rani no Hajiro (Queen’s tomb), where the female members of the royal family were buried, is now a market for women's clothing, jewelry, and accessories. Traditional Garba clothes are also sold here. Many types of mouth fresheners, Mukhwas, stalls are nearby. Rani no Hajiro lies to the east of Manek Chowk.

=== Ahmedabad Stock Exchange Building ===
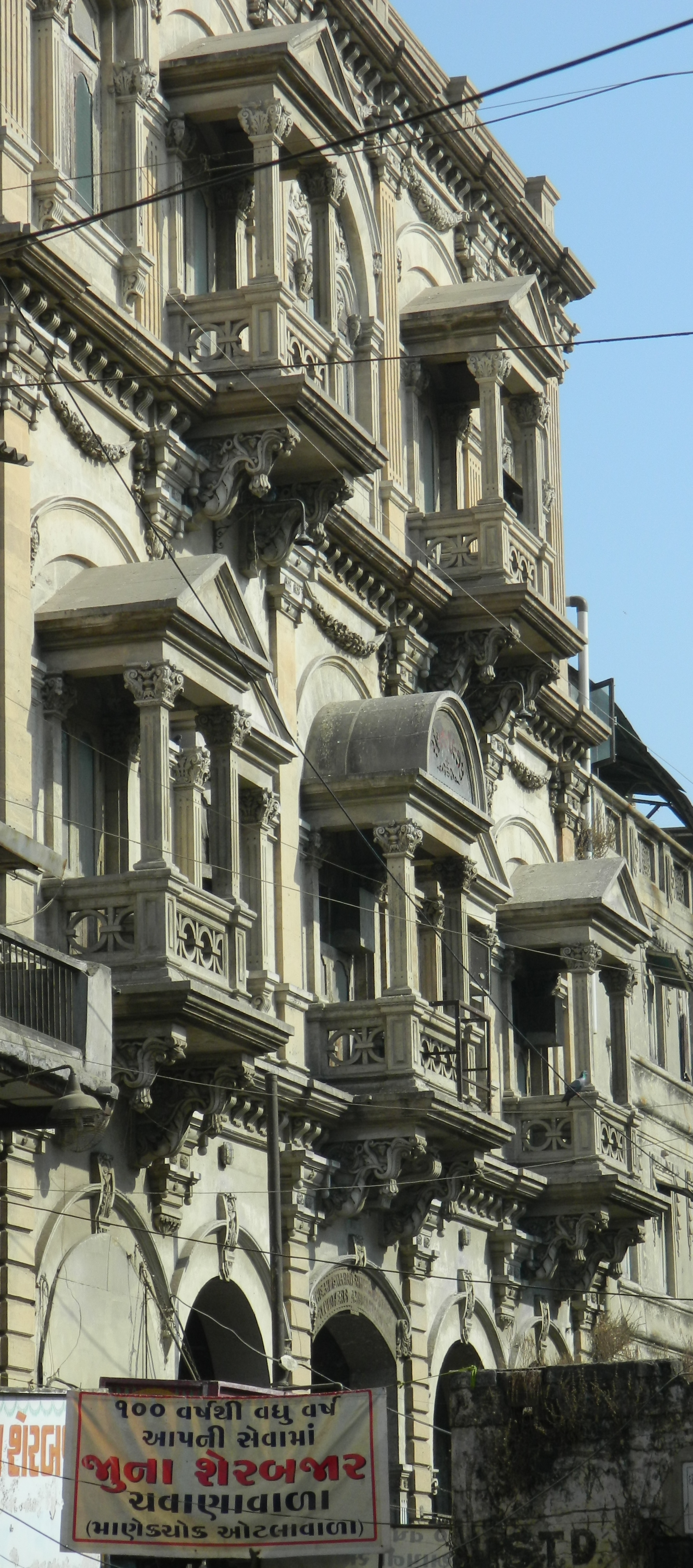
Ahmedabad Stock Exchange heritage building

Established in 1894, the Ahmedabad Stock Exchange is the oldest stock exchange in India after the Bombay Stock Exchange. It operated in this location until 1996, housed in a 93-year-old heritage building showcasing British architecture.

=== Mahurat Pol ===
It was the first pol (housing cluster) of Ahmedabad. Jains settled here around the 1450s. There are two temples inside the pol, Sheetalnath Jain temple and Dholeshwar Mahadev temple.

== See also ==
- Ahmedabad
- Bhadra Fort
- Fort and Gates of Ahmedabad
