= Teen Darwaza =

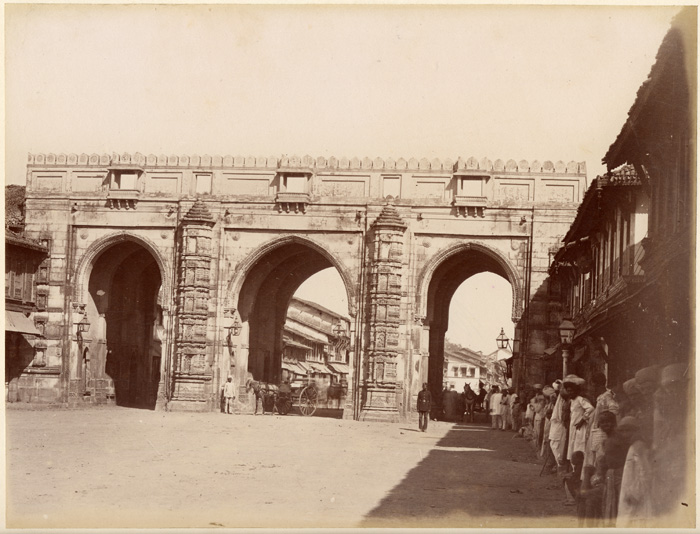
- Teen Darwaza in 1880s

- Location within Ahmedabad Location within Gujarat
- Alternative names: Tran Darwaja, Three Gates, Triple Gateway, Tripolia Gateway

General information
- Type: Gateway
- Architectural style: Indo-Islamic architecture
- Location: Near Bhadra Fort, Ahmedabad, India
- Coordinates: 23.0242°N 72.5846°E
- Construction started: c. 1411
- Completed: 1415
- Owner: Archaeological Survey of India

Design and construction
- Designations: ASI Monument of National Importance No. N-GJ-5

Teen Darwaza is a historical gateway on the east of the Bhadra Fort, Ahmedabad, India. Completed in 1415, it is associated with historical as well as legendary events. The gates are featured in the logo of Ahmedabad Municipal Corporation.

== History and architecture ==
The Teen Darwaza was an exit from Bhadra Fort to the east. The gateway has three arches which lead into a large enclosure, forming the outer courtyard of the palace called Maidan Shah in the past, with a fountain and raised terrace in the centre. The roadway in the central opening is 17 feet wide, and that of each side arch is 13 feet wide. It has highly decorated buttresses on the faces of piers between the arches. The height of the arches is twenty-five feet. The terrace on the top of the gateway was formerly roofed over. But in 1877 the gateway was repaired, and the terrace thrown open. Here the great feudatories or foreign embassies assembled before approaching the presence, and the sovereign enthroned on the terrace, mustered the troops for martial enterprises and gala-day reviews, or held court in the cool of the evening beside the splashing fountain. The area is now a congested market area.

It was built by Ahmad Shah I immediately after the foundation of Ahmedabad and completed in 1415. Through it, in 1459, Mahmud Begada, king for only a few months, and not fifteen years old, quiver on back and bow in hand, with only 300 horsemen, marched to disperse his rebel nobles and their 30,000 followers. Leaving the palace, the young king ordered the roads leading to it to be held by elephants, and, with the royal music playing, marched slowly along the main street. His cool bravery gave some of his faithful nobles time to join, and forming a considerable force, though small compared with the insurgents, attacked them, put them to flight, and destroyed their leaders. Later the newly appointed Maratha governors used to aim five arrows at one of its beams, and augur good or ill to their administration in accordance with their success in striking it.

=== Maratha Inscription ===
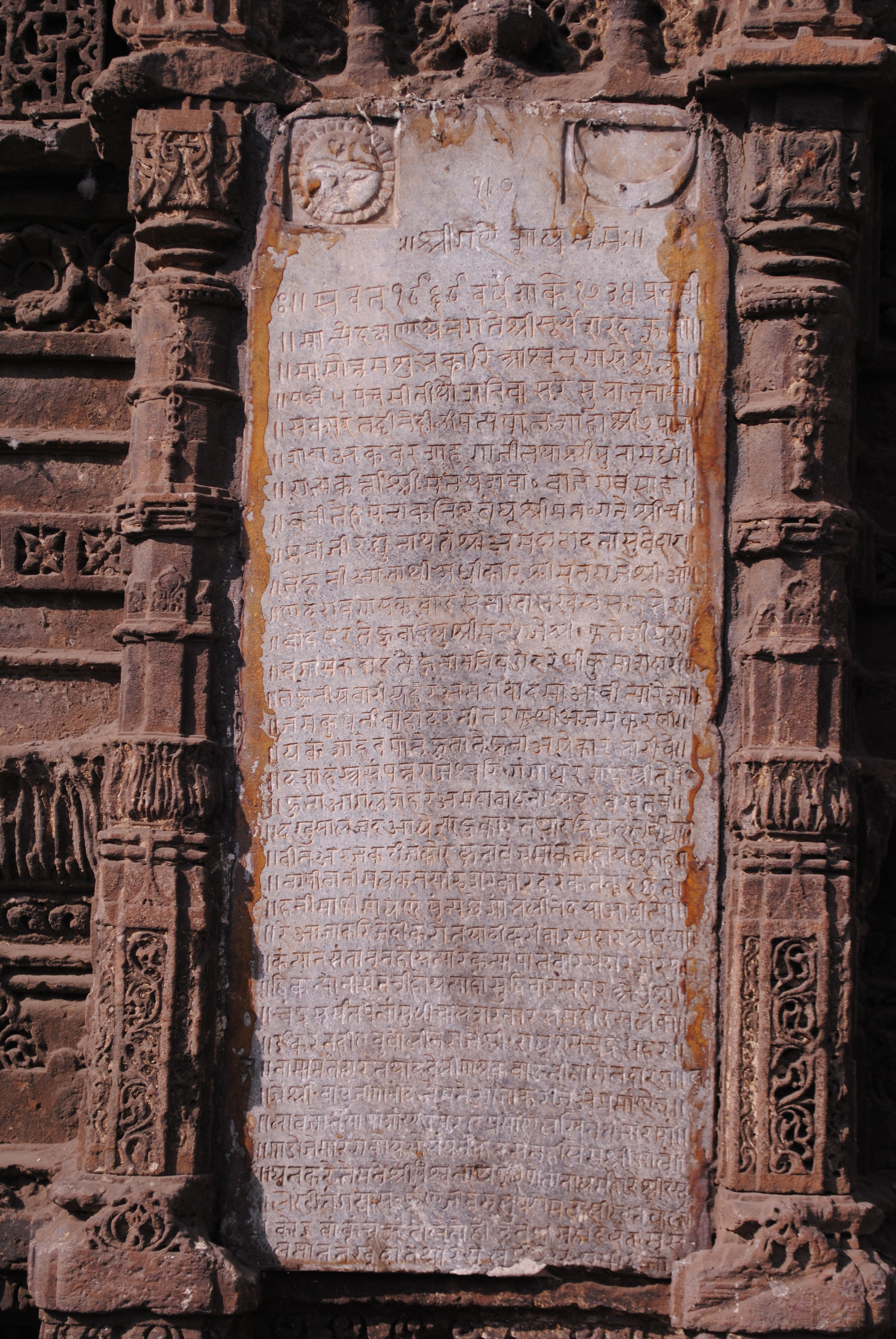
Maratha inscription on pillar of Teen Darwaza about inheritance of property to female members of family

Maratha governor Chimnaji Raghunath decreed and inscribed farman on Teen Darwaza in 1812 declaring equal right to women in inheritance of ancestral property. Raghunath had appealed to Hindu and Muslims both. This plaque engraved in Devnagari script and dated 10 October 1812 reads, Let the daughter get her due share of fathers property without any hitch. So is Lord Vishwanath's command. If you defy, the Hindu will have to answer Mahadev and the Mussalman will have to explain to Allah or Rasool.

=== Eternal lamp ===
Legend

Years ago, Laxmi, the Goddess of Wealth, came to the gate of the Bhadra Fort to leave the city in the night. Watchman Khwaja Siddique Kotwal stopped her and identified her. He asked her not to leave the fort until he obtained a permission from the king, Ahmad Shah. He went to the king and beheaded himself in order to keep Laxmi in the city. It resulted in the prosperity of the city.

There is a tomb near Bhadra Gate of the fort dedicated to Siddique Kotwal and a temple to Bhadra Kali, representing Laxmi. A lamp in one of the niche of Teen Darwaza is burning there for more than six hundred years by a Muslim family in a dedication to the legend.

== Gallery ==
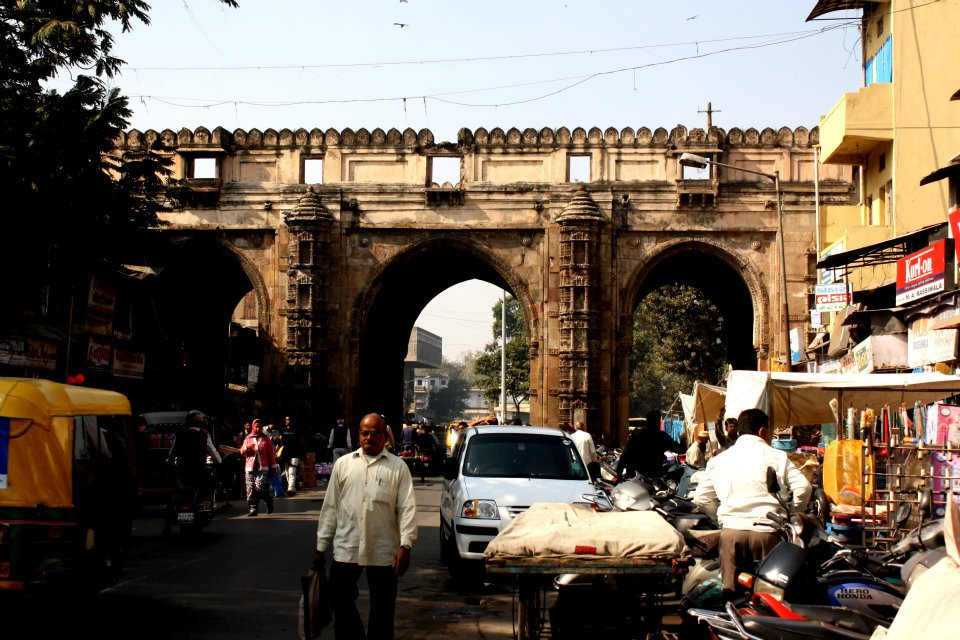
Teen Darwaza

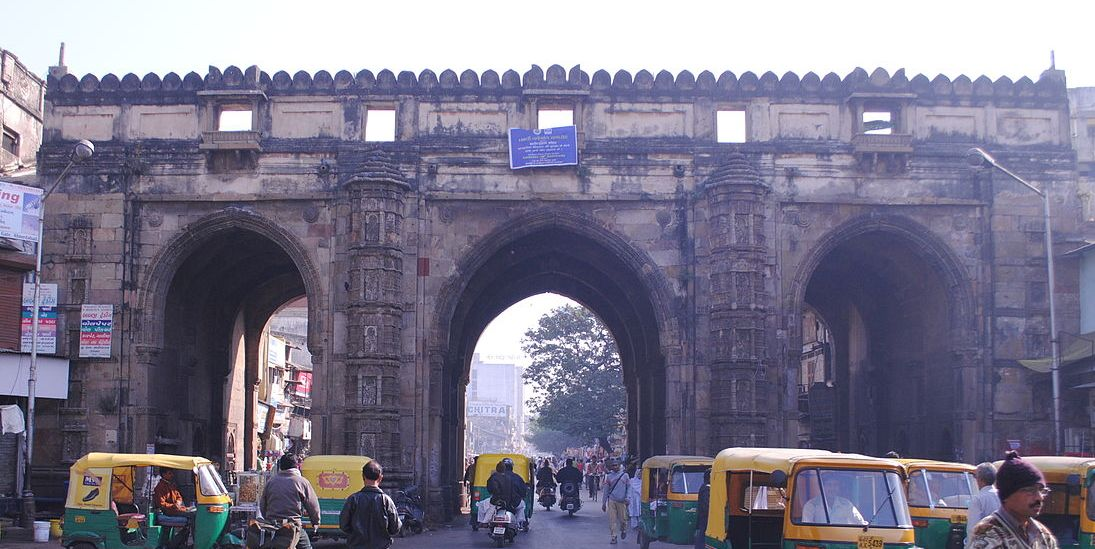
Teen Darwaza

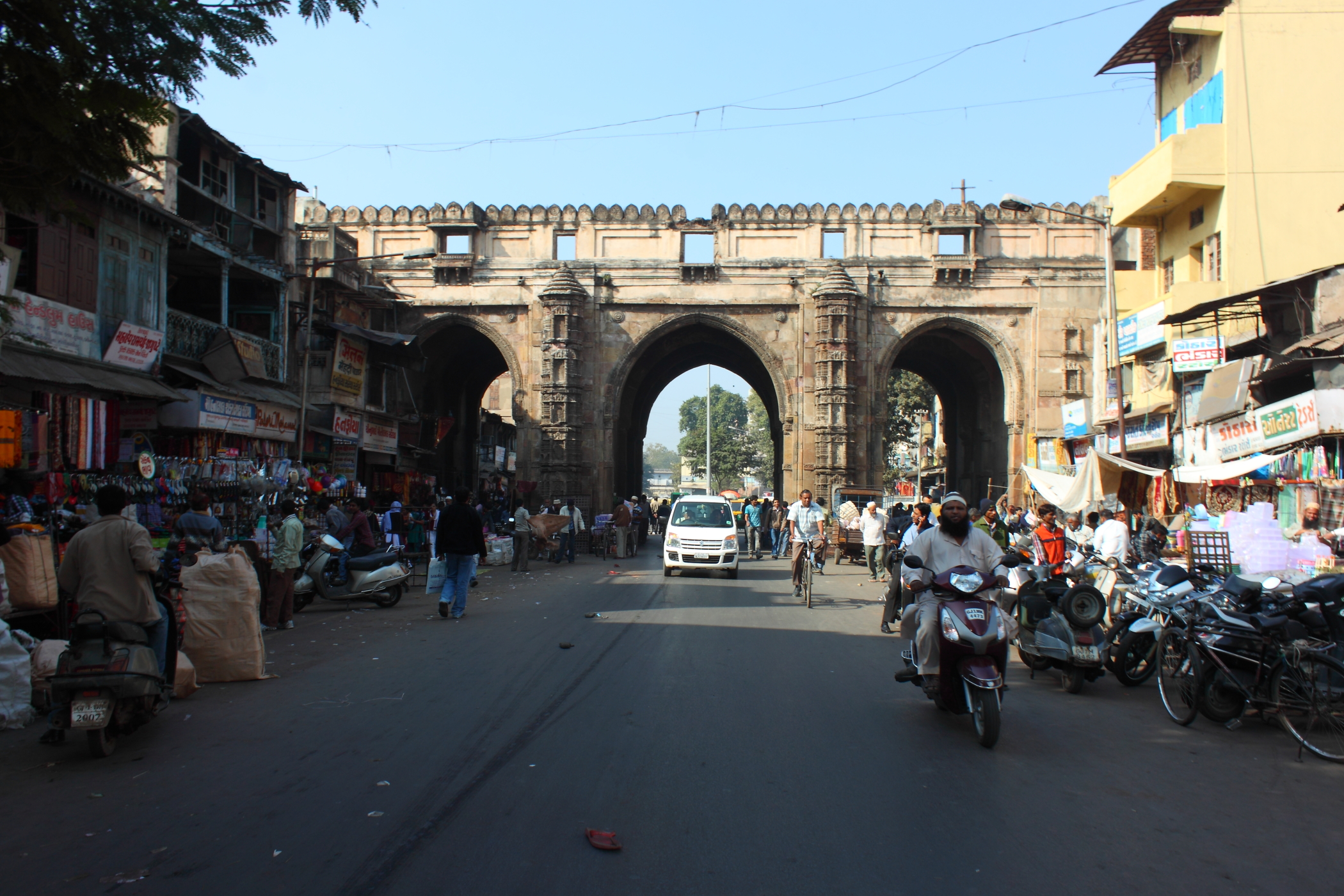
Roadside vendors at Teen Darwaza

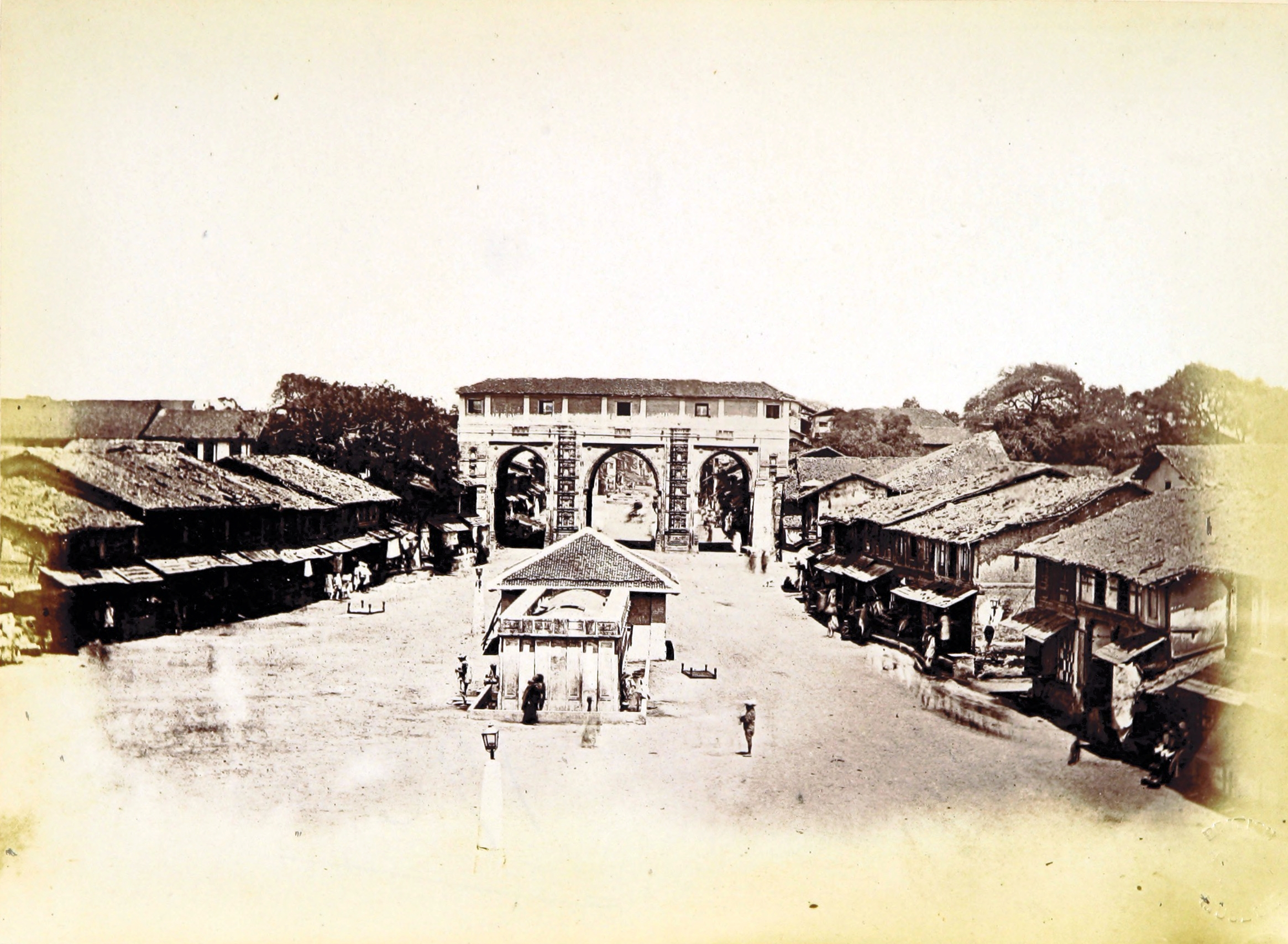
Teen Darwaza in 1866

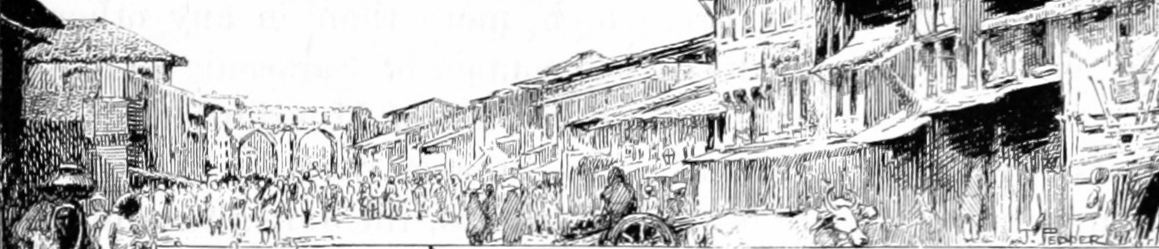
Street scene of 1890
