= Bhadra Fort =

Fort in Ahmedabad, India

- Part of Old Amdavad
- Ahmedabad, India
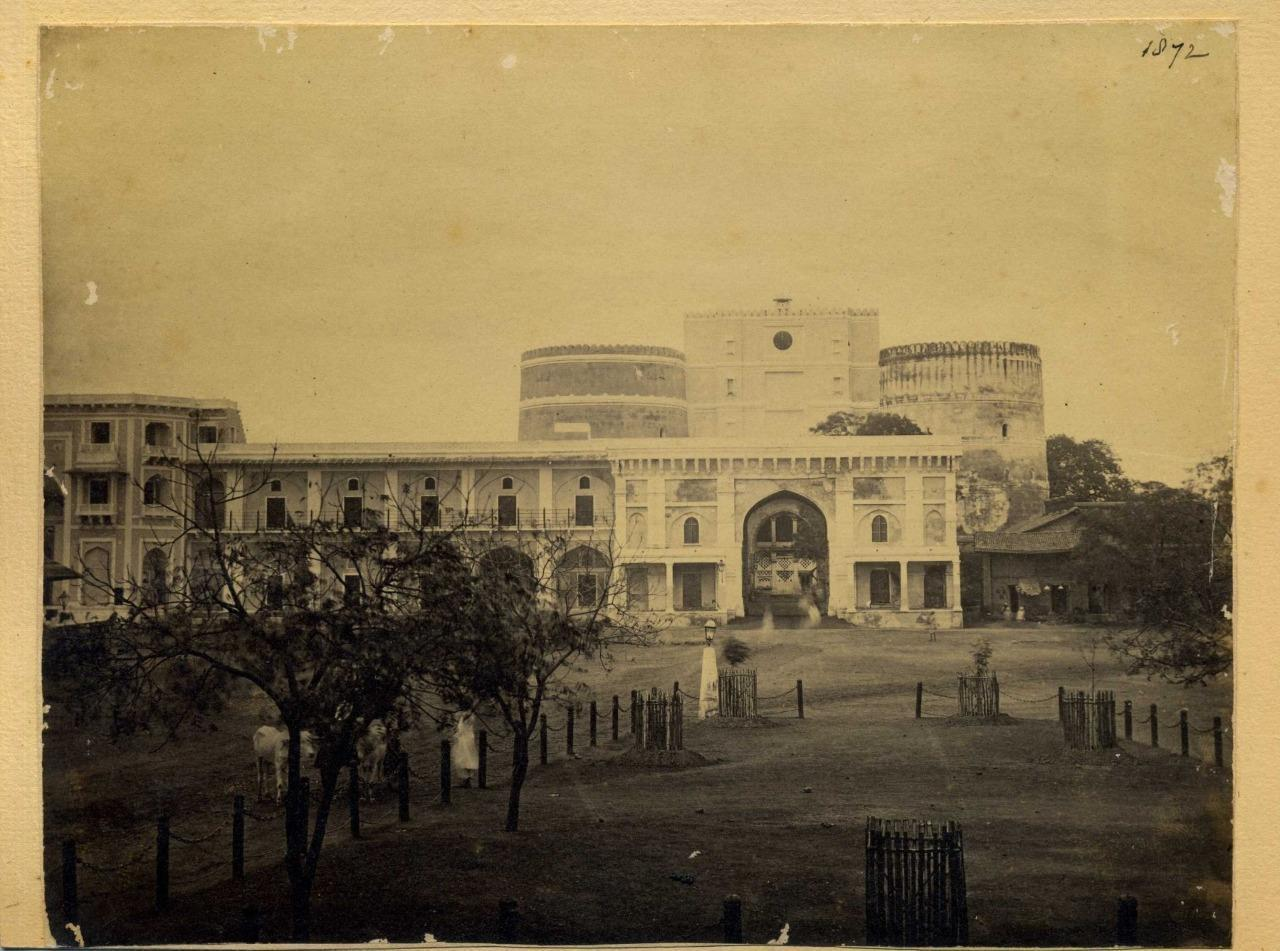
- Bhadra fort in 1872

Site information
- Type: Castle and City wall
- Code: ASI Monument N-GJ-2
- Owner: ASI
- Controlled by: Gujarat Sultanate (1411-1573); Mughal Empire (1573-1719); Maratha Empire (1719-1818); Company rule in India (1818-1858); British India (1858-1947)
- Open to the public: Yes
- Condition: Ruined with survival of western walls and gates

Location
- Coordinates: 23°1′25″N 72°34′52″E

Site history
- Built: 4 March, 1411
- Built by: Ahmad Shah I of Muzaffarid dynasty
- Materials: Stone and brick
- Battles/wars: Battle of Ahmedabad (1459); First Anglo-Maratha War (1779)

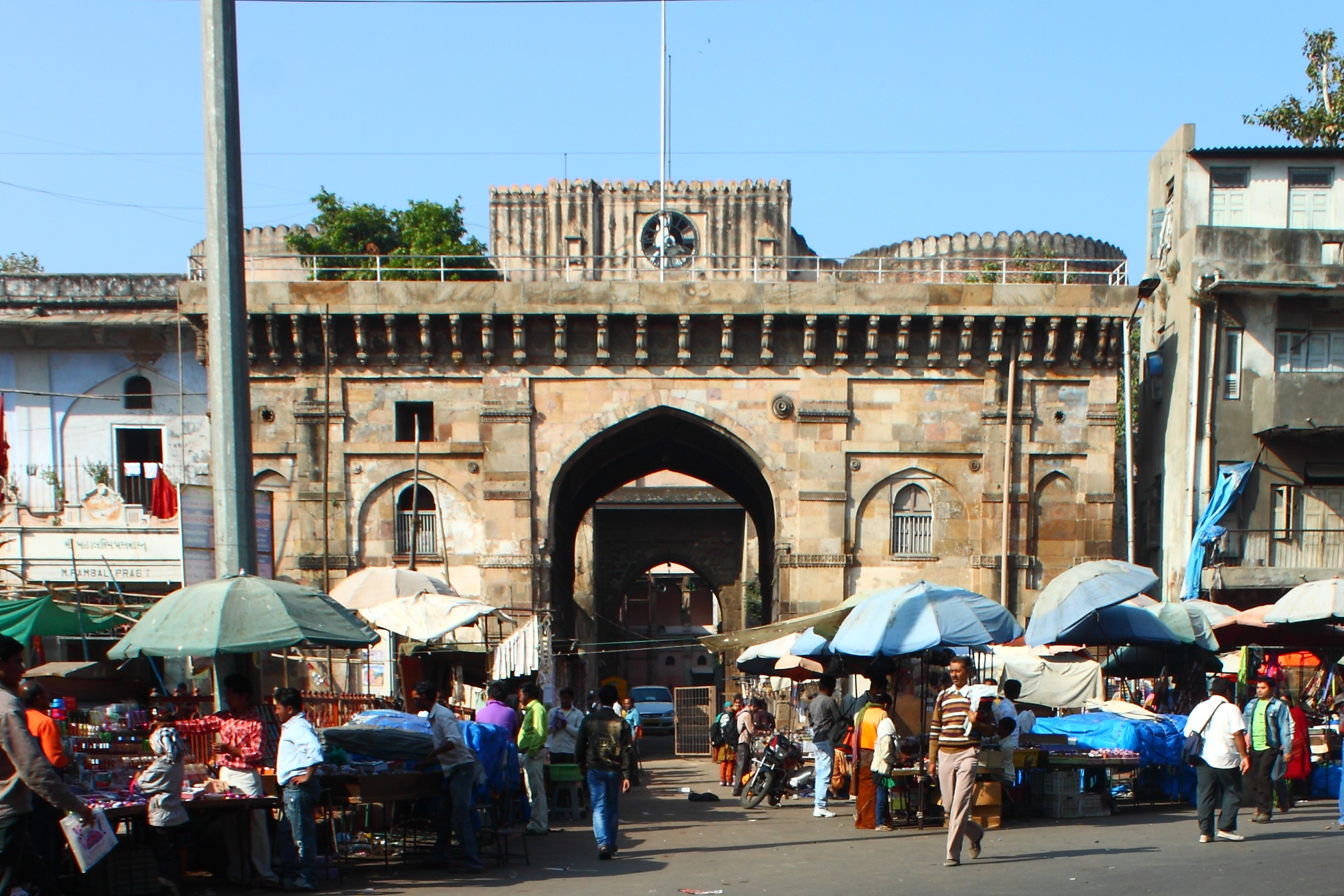
Bhadra Fort Gate

Bhadra Fort is situated in the walled city area of Ahmedabad, India. It was built by Ahmad Shah I in 1411. With its well-carved royal palaces, mosques, gates and open spaces, it was renovated in 2014 by the Amdavad Municipal Corporation (AMC) and the Archaeological Survey of India (ASI) as a cultural centre for the city. It was later controlled by the Mughal Empire, the Maratha Empire, and the British, who used the complex as a prison during the British Raj.

== Etymology ==
It is believed the fort adopted the name Bhadra after a temple of Bhadra Kali, a form of Laxmi which was established during Maratha rule but a plaque near the fort tells a different story:

"The Bhadra Gate - C.A.D. 1411 - The massive fortified gate was built in or about 1411 to serve as the principal eastern entrance of the palace erected here by Sultan Ahmad Shah I (1411-1442), the founder of Ahmedabad. The palace called the Bhadra after the ancient Rajput citadel of that name at Anhilwada-Patan (Baroda State), which the first three kings of the dynasty of Gujarat Sultans had held before Ahmedabad became the capital. Three inscribed slabs on the walls connecting this gateway with two ancillary gates behind are now almost completely defaced. One of these appears to show a date of the time of Jahangir (1605-1627). "

== History ==
Ahmedabad was named after Ahmad Shah I of the Muzaffarid dynasty. He established Ahmedabad as the new capital of Gujarat Sultanate and built Bhadra Fort on the east bank of the Sabarmati River. It was also known as Arak Fort as described in Mirat-i-Ahmadi. The foundation stone of the fort was laid at Manek Burj in 1411. Square in form, enclosing an area of about forty-three acres, and containing 162 houses, the Bhadra fort had eight gates, three large, two in the east and one in the south-west corner; three middle-sized, two in the north and one in the south; and two small, in the west. The area within the fort had become occupied by urban developments by 1525. So a second fortification was built later by Mahmud Begada, the grandson of Ahmed Shah, with an outer wall 10 km (6.2 mi) in circumference and consisting of 12 gates, 189 bastions and over 6,000 battlements as described in Mirat-i-Ahmadi. Almost 60 governors ruled Gujarat during the Mughal period including the future Mughal emperors Jahangir, Shah Jahan and Aurangzeb. A seraglio was built later in the 17th century by a Mughal governor, Azam Khan, known as Azam Khan Sarai. It was used as a Musafir khana (a resting place for travellers) during Mughal rule.

Sarsenapati Umabaisaheb Khanderao Dabhade became the only female Commander-in-Chief in the history of the Marathas in 1732. She commanded the Maratha Army and fought a war near Ahmedabad at Bhadra Fort defeating Mughal Sardar Joravar Khan Babi.

Joint rule by Peshwa and Gaekwad of the Maratha Empire brought an end to the Mughal era in 1783. During the First Anglo–Maratha War (1775–1782), General Thomas Wyndham Goddard with 6,000 troops stormed Bhadra Fort and captured Ahmedabad on 15 February 1779. There was a garrison of 6,000 Arab and Sindhi infantry and 2,000 horses. Losses in the fight totalled 108, including two Britons. After the war, the fort was later handed back to Marathas under the Treaty of Salbai.

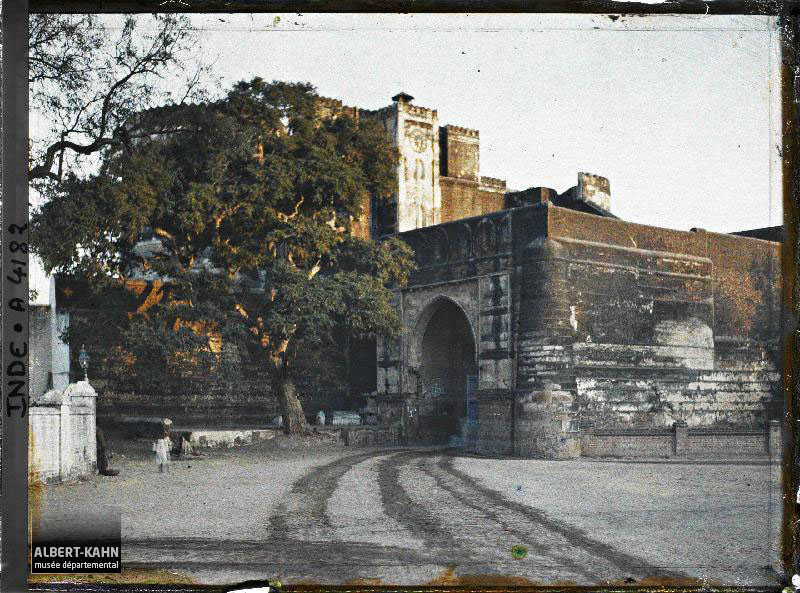
Bhadra Fort, 1913

Ahmedabad was conquered by the British in 1817. The fort complex was used as a prison during the British Raj.

Azam Khan sarai currently houses the government offices, an ASI office, a post office and the city's civil courts. It is also used for flag hoisting on Independence Day and Republic Day.

== Structures ==
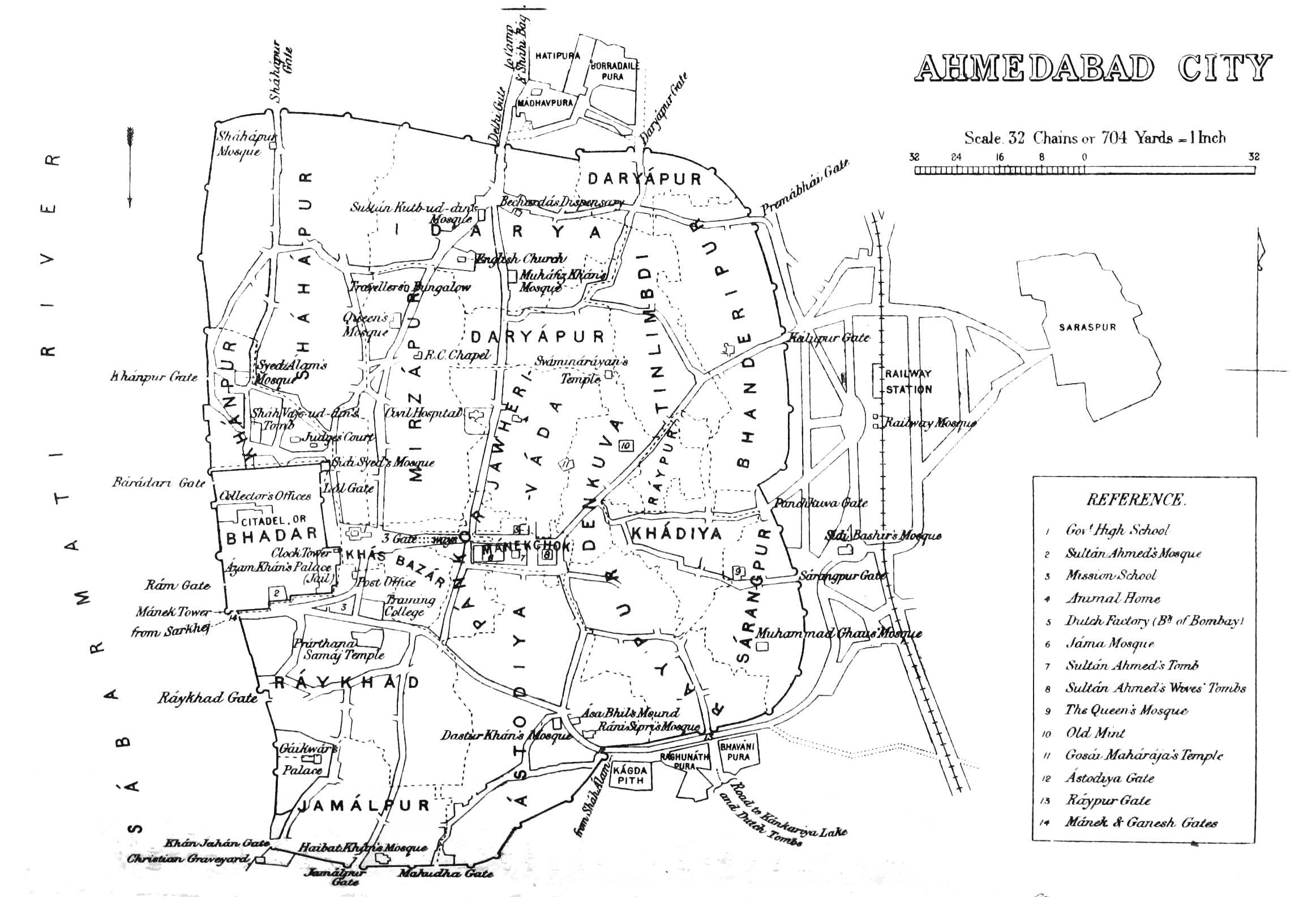
Bhadra and other structures in old Ahmedabad, 1879

=== Citadel, royal square and Teen Darwaza ===
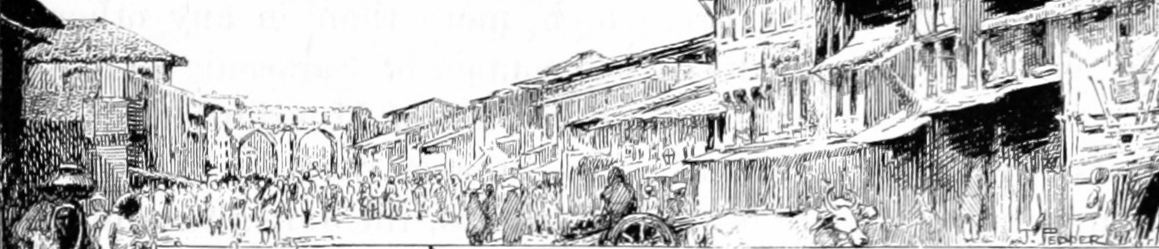
Teen Darwaza visible in street scene of 1890

Bhadra Fort housed royal palaces and the beautiful Nagina Baugh and the royal Ahmed Shah's Mosque on the west side and an open area known as Maidan-Shah on the east side. It had a fortified city wall with 14 towers, eight gates and two large openings covering an area of 43 acres. The eastern wall on the river bank can still be seen. The fort complex was used as a royal court during his reign. On the eastern side of a fort, there is a triple gateway known as Teen Darwaza which was formerly an entrance to the royal square, Maidan-Shah. The road beyond Teen Darwaza leads Manek Chowk, a mercantile square. On the south side along the road, there is a congregational mosque known as Jami Masjid.

The citadel's architecture is Indo-sarcenic with intricately carved arches and balconies. Fine latticework adorns windows and murals. There are some Islamic inscriptions on the arches of the fort. The palace contains royal suites, the imperial court, halls, and a prison.

The Maidan-Shah, or the kings market, is at least 1600 feet long and half as many broad and beset all about with rows of Palm-trees and Date-trees intermixed with Citron-trees and Orange-trees, whereof there are very many in the several streets: which is not only verry pleasant to the sight, by the delightful prospect it affords, but also makes the walking among them more convenient by reason of the coolness. Besides this Maidan, there are in the city four Bazaars, or public places, where are sold all kind of merchandise.

— Johan Albrecht de Mandelslo, German traveller; in October, 1638, Mandelslo's Travels In Western India, Page 22

=== Azam Khan Sarai ===
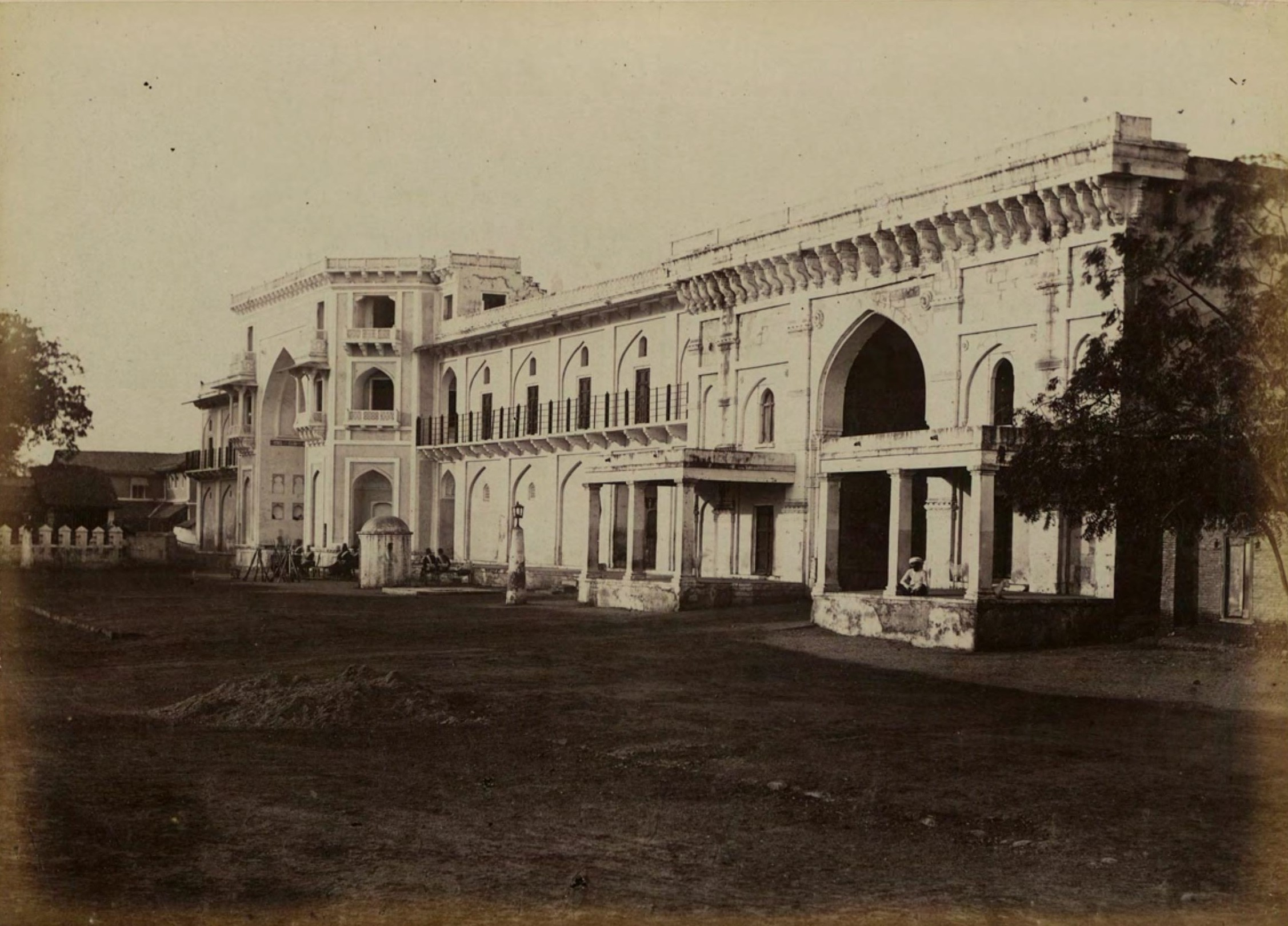
Azam Khan Sarai in 1866 when it was used as jail

Azam Khan, also known as Mir Muhammad Baquir, was a Mughal governor. He built a palace known as Azam Khan Sarai in 1637. Its entrance, 5.49 meters high, opens onto an octagonal hall which had a low balcony made up of stone in the upper floor. It was used as a resting place for travellers in the Mughal era and as a hospital and a jail during British rule. There was a gibbet on the roof of Azam Khan Sarai used for hanging during the Gujarat Sultanate and the British era. According to one story, it was here Ahmed Shah hanged his son-in-law who was convicted of murder.

=== Bhadra Kali Temple ===
A room in north wing of Azam Khan Sarai was turned into the temple of Bhadra Kali during Maratha rule. It has a black statue of Goddess Bhadra Kali with four hands.

Legend

Years ago, Laxmi, the Goddess of Wealth, came to the gate of Bhadra Fort to leave the city in the night. Watchman Siddique Kotwal stopped her and identified her. He asked her not to leave fort until he obtained permission from the king. He beheaded himself in order to keep Laxmi in the city. It resulted in the prosperity of the city.

There is a tomb near Bhadra Gate dedicated to Siddique Kotwal and a temple to Bhadra Kali, representing Laxmi. A lamp in one of the hole in Teen Darwaza is lit continuously for more than six hundred years by a Muslim family is dedicated to Laxmi.

=== Clock tower ===
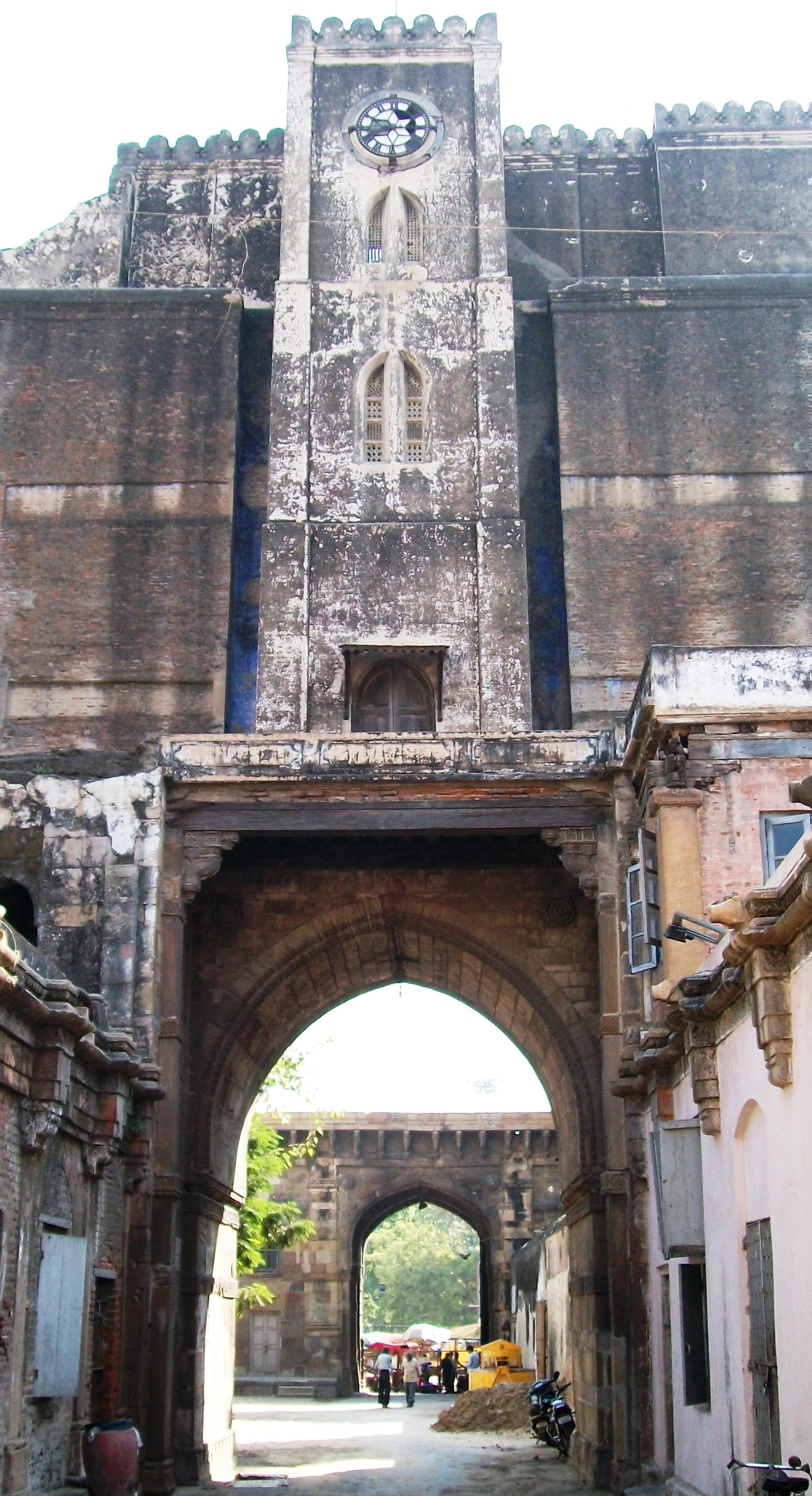
Bhadra fort clock tower

The Bhadra Fort tower clock was brought from London in 1849 at cost of Rs. 8000 and installed here at the cost of £243 (Rs. 2430) in 1878 by the British East India Company. At night, it was illuminated from behind by a kerosene lamp which was replaced by an electric light in 1915. Ahmedabad's first electrical connection, it ceased to operate in the 1960s but the AMC and the ASI now plan to repair it.

== Redevelopment ==
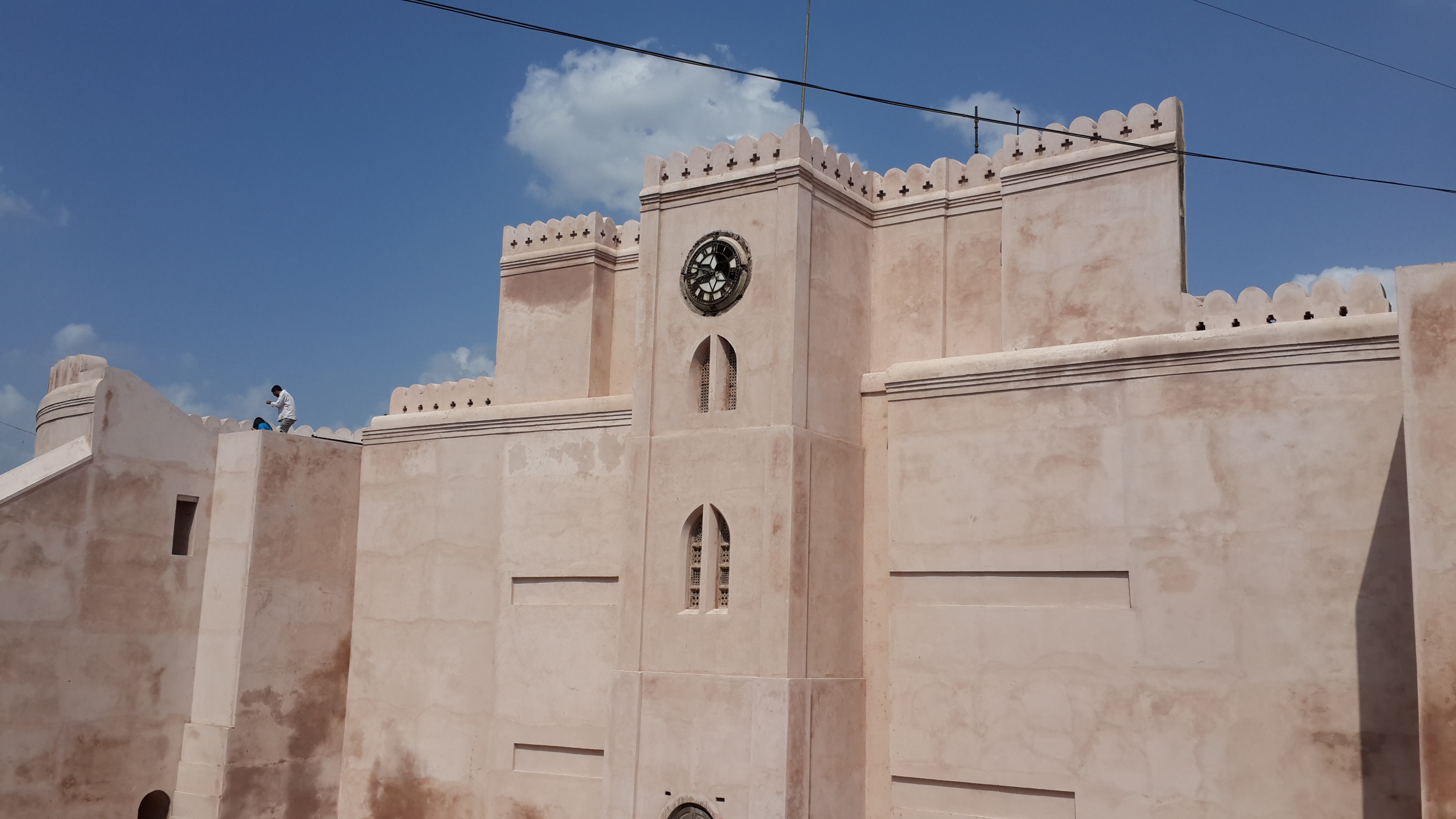
Bhadra Fort from inside and tower clock after renovation

Under Bhadra Plaza Development Project, an initiative of the AMC and the ASI, Bhadra Fort was renovated and the open space between the fort and Teen Darwaza, earlier known as Maidan-Shah was restored. Landscaping was recreated based on the accounts of historical past travellers. The work started on 26 January 2012 and the renovation of open areas was completed in November 2014. The cost of the project is estimated Rs 115 crore. A stretch between the fort and Teen Darwaza earlier known as Maidan-Shah was declared a pedestrian zone. The new public amenities, marble benches and kiosks for hawkers were constructed. There are also plans for a pedestrian bridge connecting Bhadra plaza with the Sabarmati riverfront and a multilevel car park at Lal Darwaza. The museum and galleries are planned on the first floor of the fort palace while a handicraft outlet will be housed on the ground floor. A traditional restaurant, food and ethnic markets as well as an exhibition centre are also planned. It is the first heritage and pedestrianization project under JnNURM. Jaishankar Sundari hall, a performing arts venue, was renovated and reopened in 2010.

The city civil court and sessions court were operated in buildings adjacent to Azam Khan Sarai. They were transferred to old high court building on Ashram Road. The new eight-floor court building is planned after demolition of old buildings. The plan was challenged in Gujarat High Court citing protected monument laws and regulations but high court permitted the construction after presentation by authorities.

=== Recognition ===
- HUDCO Award for Best Practices to Improve the Living Environment 2013

== Gallery ==
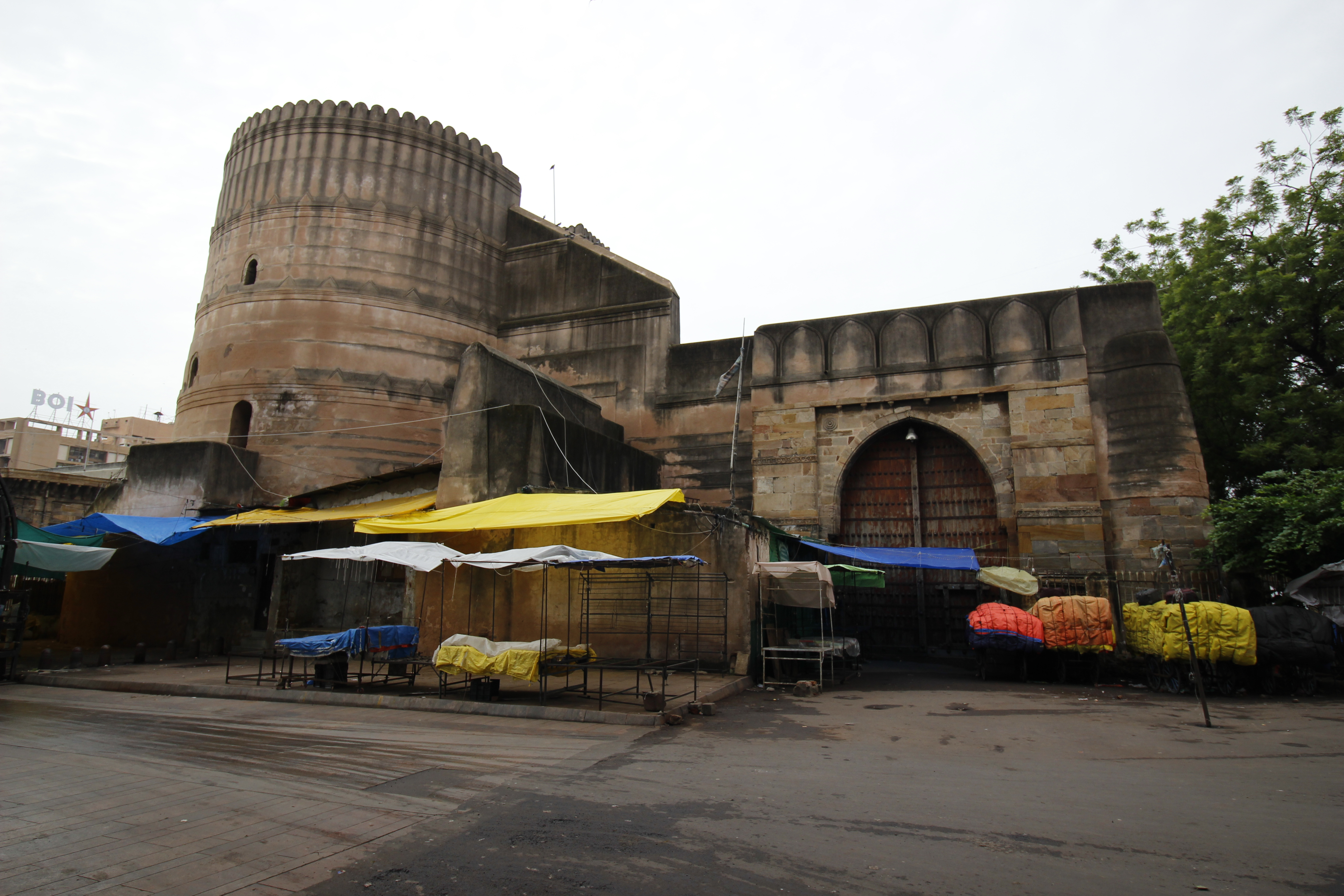
Outer view

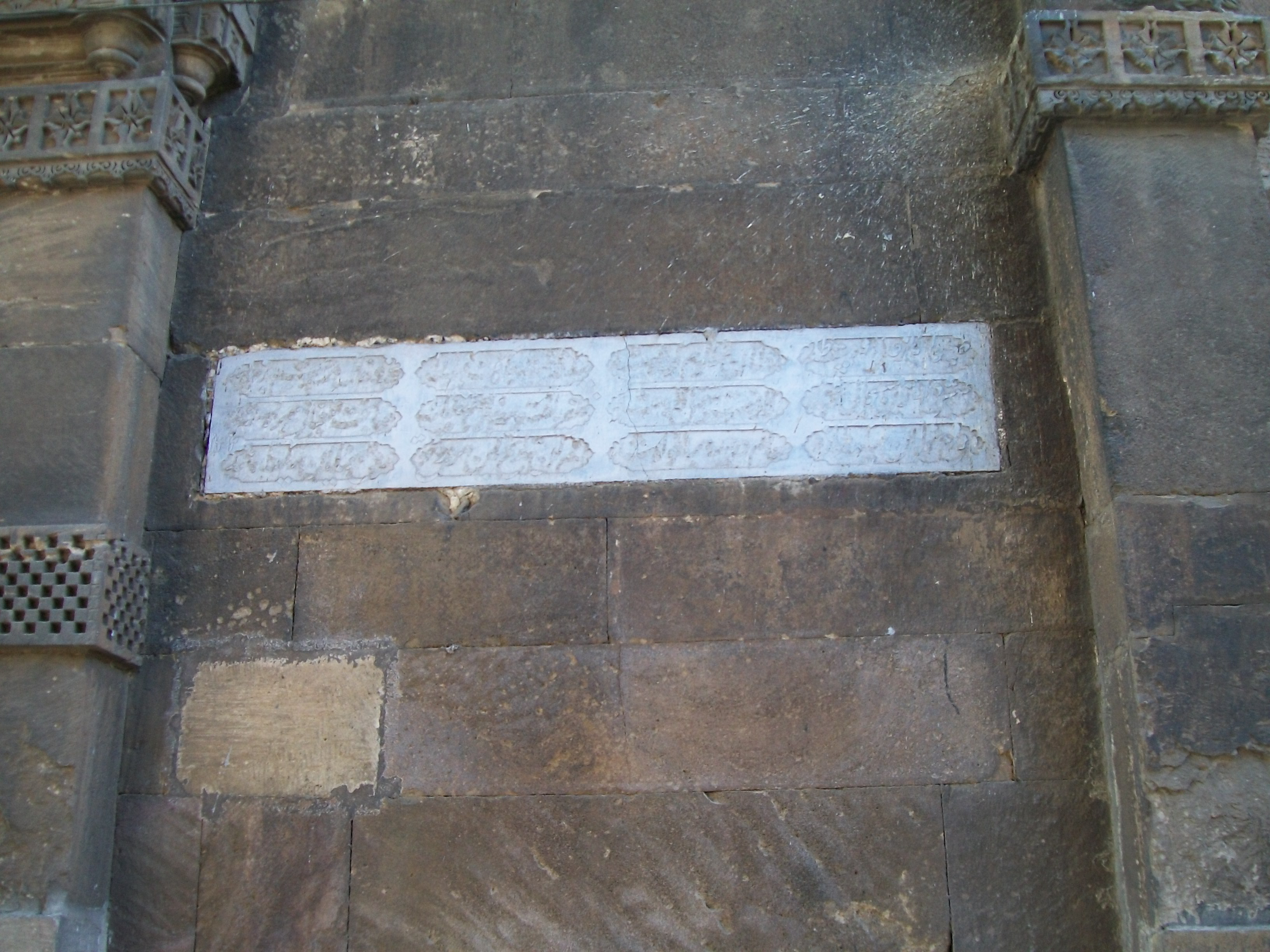
Bhadra Fort inscription

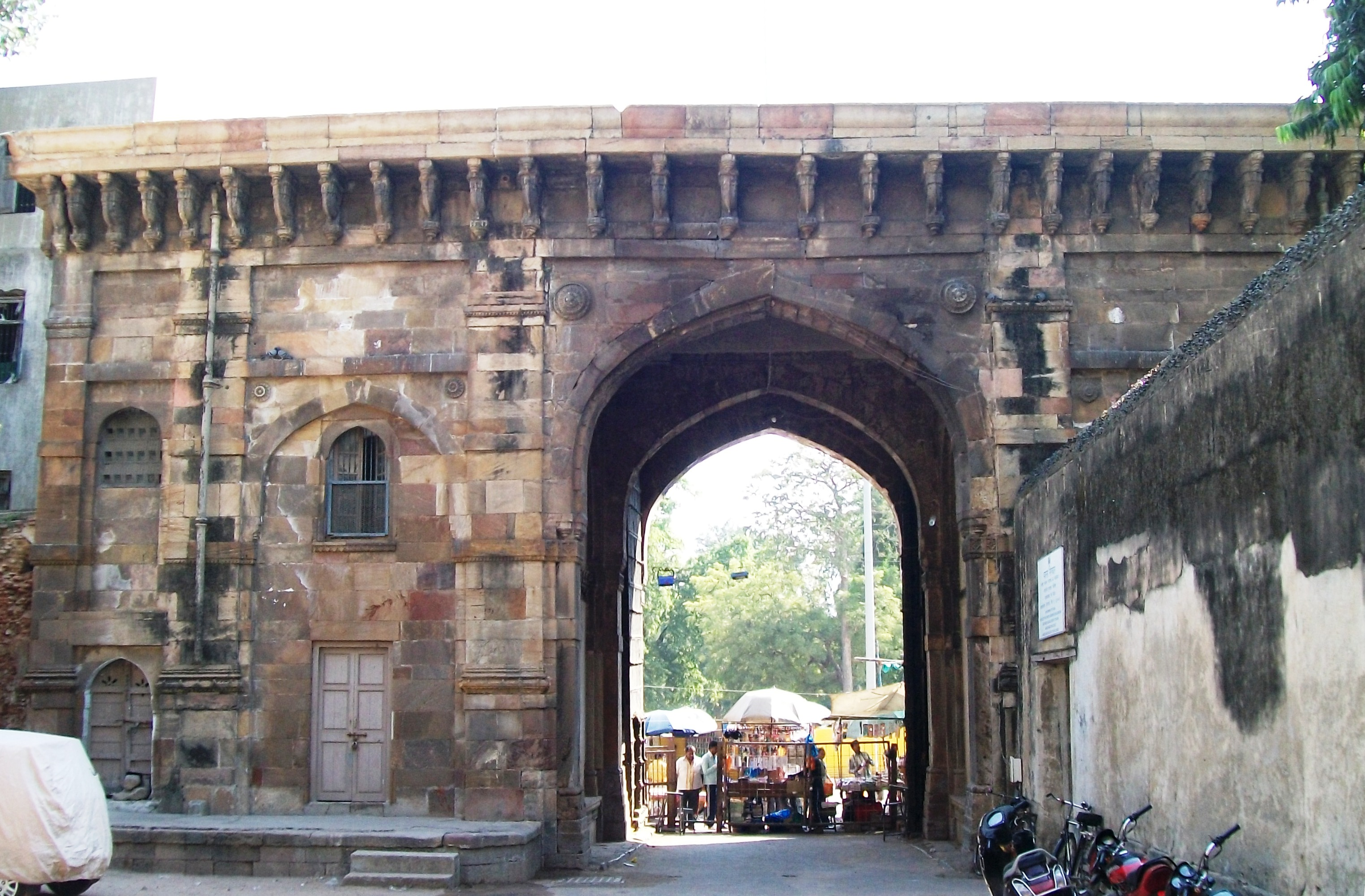
Bhadra fort gate from inside

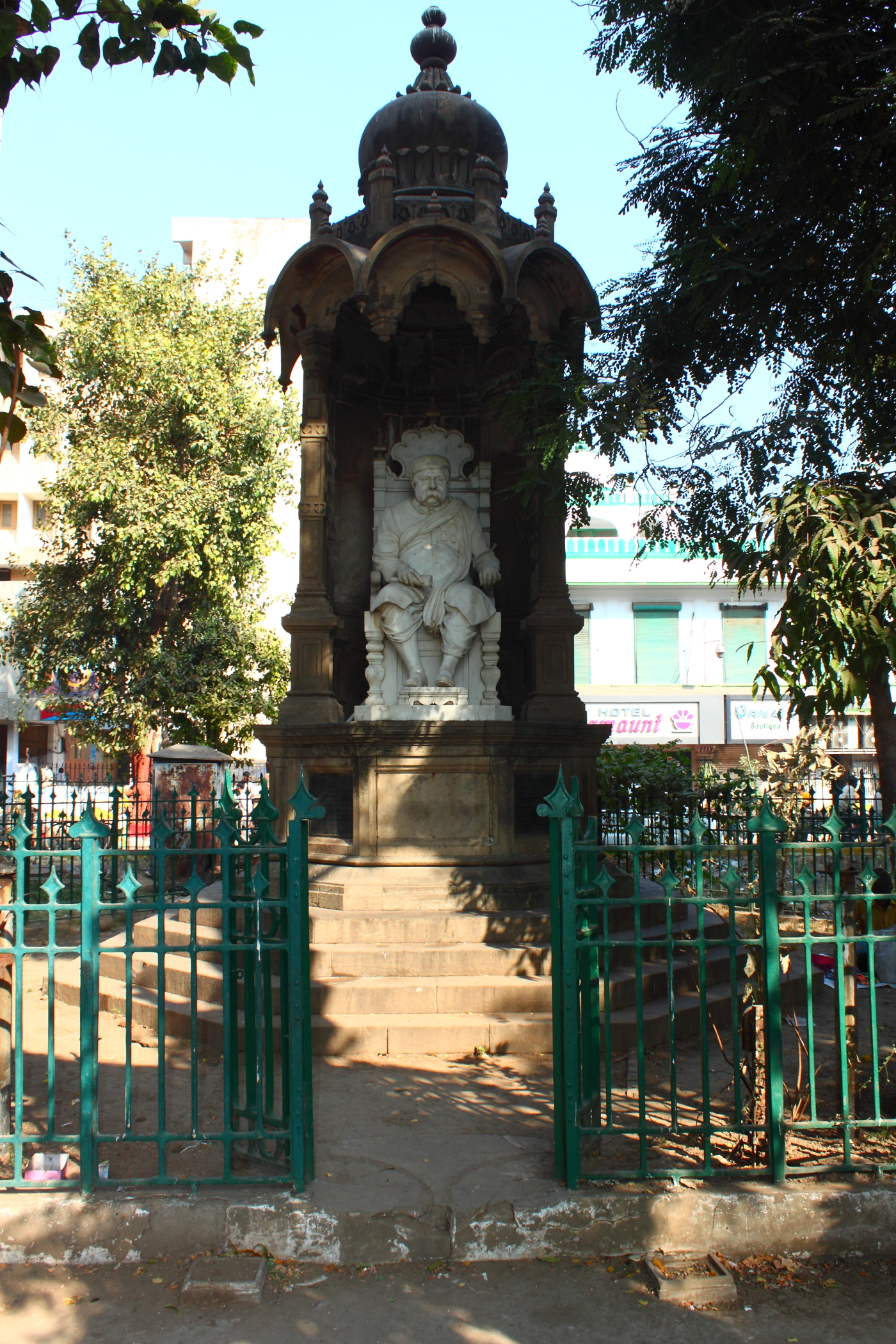
Statue of Chinubhai Baronet in Royal Square

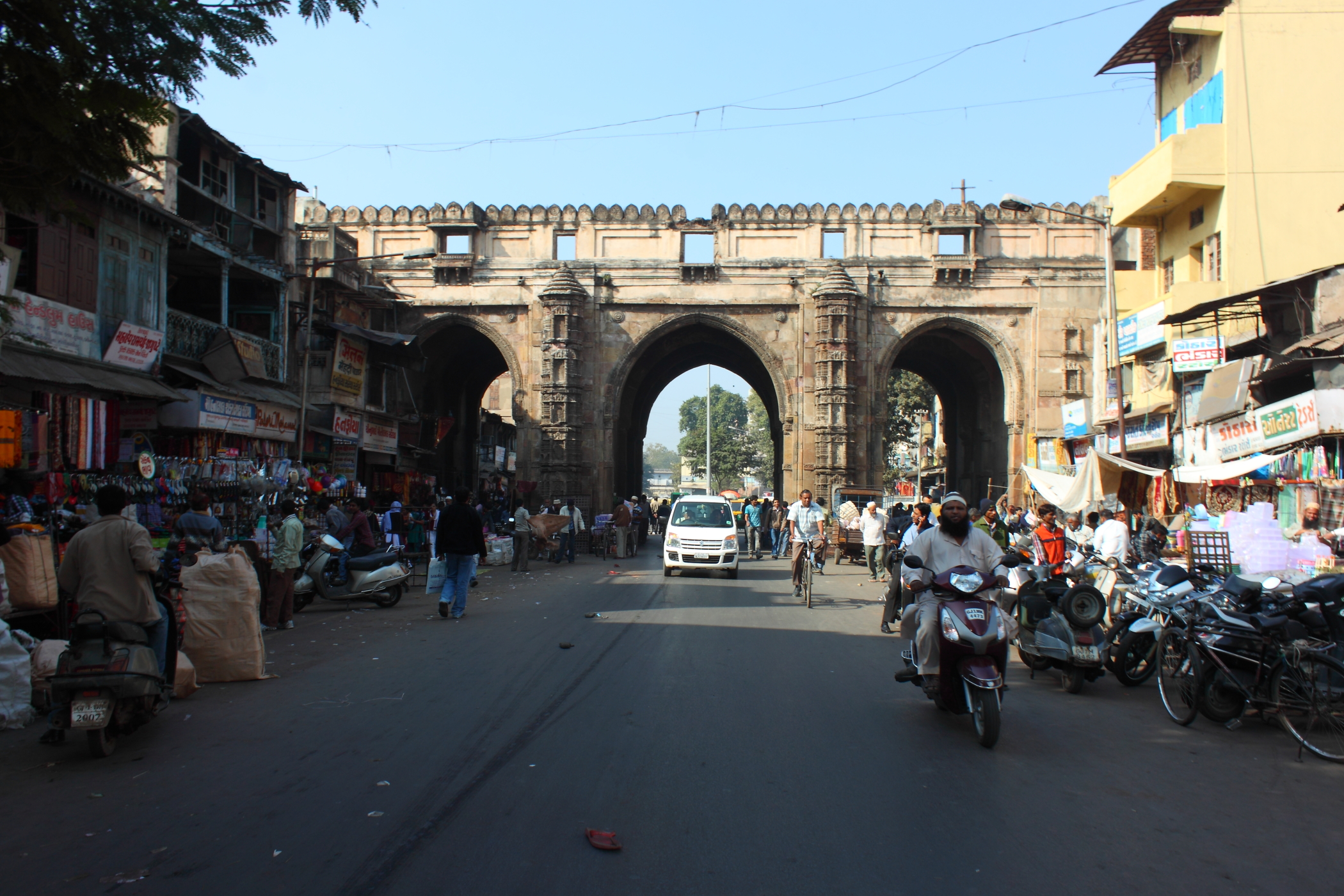
Roadside vendors at Teen Darwaza

== See also ==
- Ahmedabad
- History of Ahmedabad
- Gates of Ahmedabad
- Teen Darwaza
- Manek Chowk
- Jami Mosque
- Kankaria Lake
