= Johan Albrecht de Mandelslo =

German adventurer

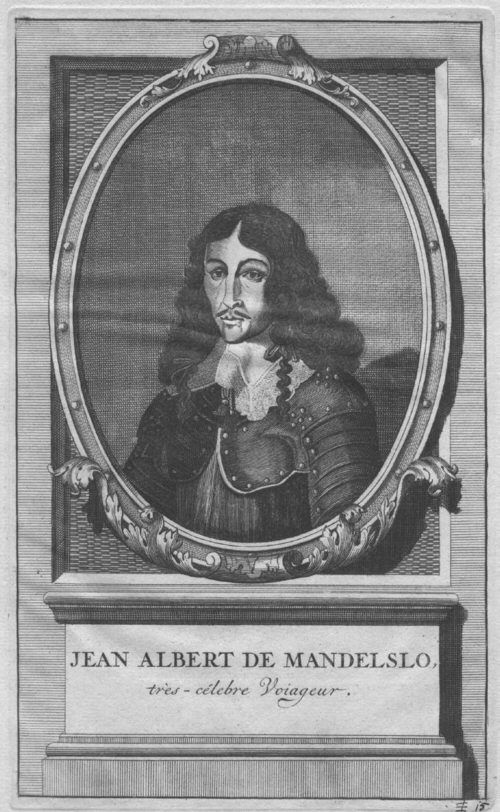
Johann Albrecht de Mandelslo

Johan Albrecht de Mandelslo (1616–1644) was a seventeenth-century German adventurer, who wrote about his travels through Iran (Persia) and India. Born at Schönberg in Mecklenburg, Germany. After traveling to Isfahan with a diplomatic mission, he separated from the party and made his way to India, where he made interesting observations on the Mughal Empire, then ruled by Shah Jahan. In 1638, Mandelslo visited the ruins at Persepolis in Persia; his name and the year can be found inscribed in the Gate of All Nations at the entrance to the site. Arriving at the port of Surat in April 1638, he moved on to Ahmedabad and Agra. While his observations of life in the capital are useful, he apparently heard nothing about the Taj Mahal, then in its sixth year of construction. The omission may stem from his premature departure from the city, prompted by a chance meeting with the relative of a man he had killed in Persia. Fearing reprisals, he retreated to Lahore before continuing his journey through the empire's southern provinces and travelling on to the Far East. Mandelslo is an engaging and cheerful writer, whose enthusiasm for indiscriminately shooting wildlife (including snakes, buffalo and monkeys) did not endear him to his Indian travelling companions.

== Works ==
- The Voyages and Travells of the Ambassadors Sent by Frederick Duke of Holstein, to the Great Duke of Muscovy, and the King of Persia: Begun in the Year M.DC.XXXIII, and Finish'd in M.DC.XXXIX : Containing a Compleat History of Muscovy, Tartary, Persia, and Other Adjacent Countries : with Several Publick Transactions Reaching Near the Present Times : in VII Books (1669)
