= Gates of Ahmedabad =

Gates in Gujarat, India

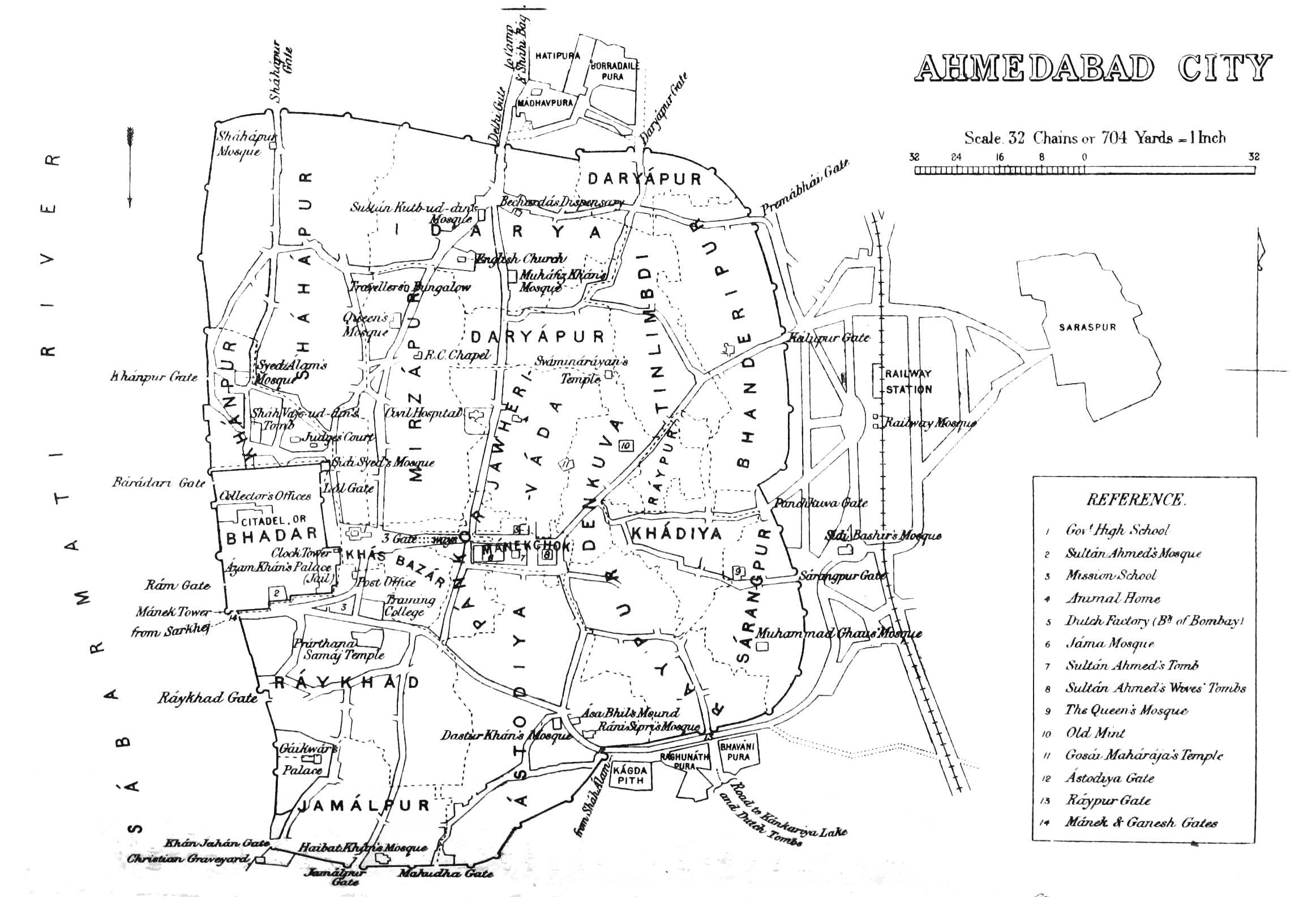
Gates of old Ahmedabad in 1855

The Darwaja or Gates of Ahmedabad were built during different times starting from 1411 as the entrances to the walled city of Ahmedabad, Gujarat, India.

These entrances to the city has a unique name and history. Pretty much the area surrounding these gates have adopted the name of the gate as the name of the locality. Each of the gate has beautiful carvings, calligraphy and some of them even balconies.

== History ==
Ahmedabad was founded over the ancient settlement of Ashaval in 1411 by Ahmed Shah I of Gujarat Sultanate. He built the first citadel Bhadra Fort starting from Manek Burj, the first bastion of the city. The Bhadra Fort had eight gates excluding palace gates. When the city expanded, Ahmed Shah built the second fort which was later fortified by Mahmud Begada in 1486. The second fort had twelve major gates and other smaller gates. After arrival of railways, British built two more gates to facilitate the movement. Later the city walls were demolished leaving the gates as monuments.

== Gates ==
Most people believe that Ahmedabad had 12 gates but some historian suggested to have 16. Later some Indologists found that Ahmedabad had 21 gates.

=== Gates of Bhadra Fort ===
Bhadra fort had eight gates, three large, two in the east and one in the south-west corner; three middle-sized, two in the north and one in the south; and two small, in the west.

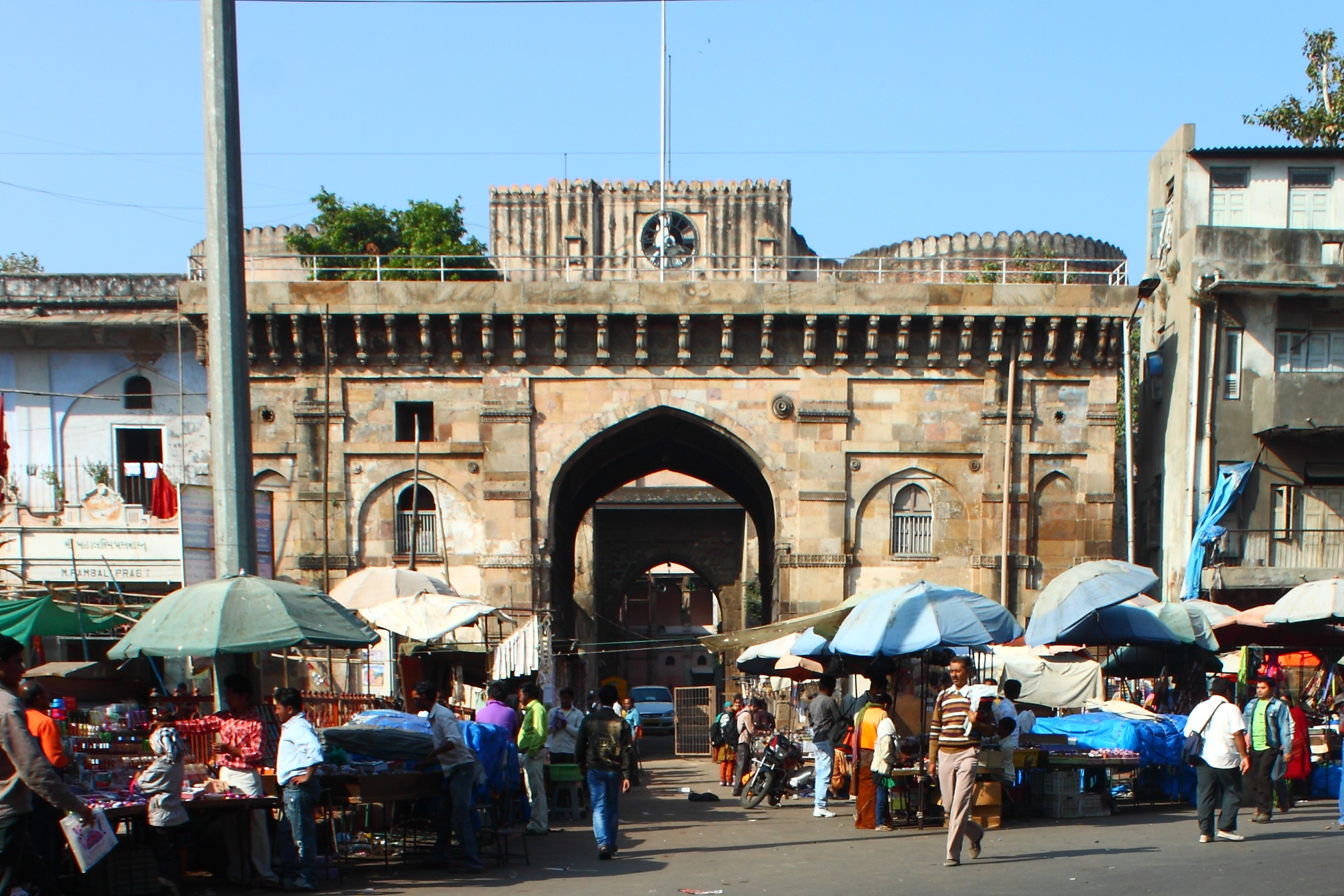
Bhadra gate

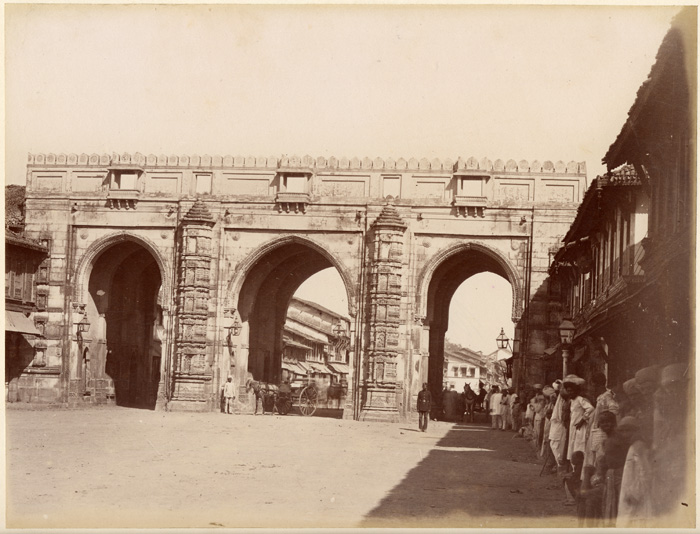
Teen Darwaza in 1880s

The details are on the north face two middle-sized gates, one leading to the Khanpur, and the other to the Mirzapur ward; the former was originally a small opening lately, at a cost of £11 (Rs. 110), turned into a gateway in 1860s, 13 feet wide and 15 feet high, with neither doors nor arches; on the east two, both large, the Lal Darwaza (23°1′0.53″N 72°35′27.34″E) in the north-east and the Bhadra gate, formerly Piran Pir’s Darwaja, (23°1′27″N 72°34′50″E, Archaeological Survey of India Monument of National Importance No. N-GJ-2); on the south two, one middle-sized gate without doors built in 1874, in the centre near Azam Khan Sarai, and the other the large Ganesh gate in the south-west corner; the former, an arched gateway, 18 feet wide and 17 feet high, cost £92 (Rs. 920); the Ganesh Bari or gate was in 1779 opened by Aapaji Ganesh, it is said, in one day; on the west two, both small, the Ram gate, with stone steps in the south-west, and the Baradari gate (23°1′35.83″N 72°34′37.64″E) in the north-west. Additionally, Teen Darwaza (23°1′27″N 72°35′4″E, ASI MNI No. N-GJ-5) was built later as an entrance to the royal square. Another Salapas gate (23°1′0.53″N 72°35′27.34″E), used for envoy of queens, is now lost. Ganesh gate is now lost under Ellis Bridge. Lal Darwaza, opposite Sidi Saiyyed Mosque, is lost now but parts of wall is visible.

=== Gates of second fort ===
As the city expanded, the second fort was built by Ahmed Shah I as described in Mirat-i- Ahmadi. It was further fortified by Mahmud Begada in 1489.

In the city walls of second fort, there were eighteen gates, fifteen large and three small. Of the fifteen, one was closed, and two were added later. These gates were, beginning from the north-west corner, three in the north-wall, the Shahpur in the north-west, the Delhi in the north, and the Dariyapur in the north-east; four in the east wall, the Premabhai, a gate built by British, in the north-east, the Kalupur in the east, the Panchkuva, a gate built by British, in the east, and the Sarangpur in the south-east; four in the south wall, the Raipur and Astodiya in the south-east, and the Mahuda, the closed gate, and the Jamalpur in the south; seven in the west wall, the Khan Jahan, Raikhad and Manek in the south-west; the three citadel gates, Ganesh, Ram, and Baradari in the centre; and the Khanpur gate in the north-west.

- Shahpur gate (23°2′21″N 72°34′46″E): the doors of iron-plated timber, the gateway of three stone arches twenty feet high and fifteen broad with a roofed platform 32 X18. Now demolished.

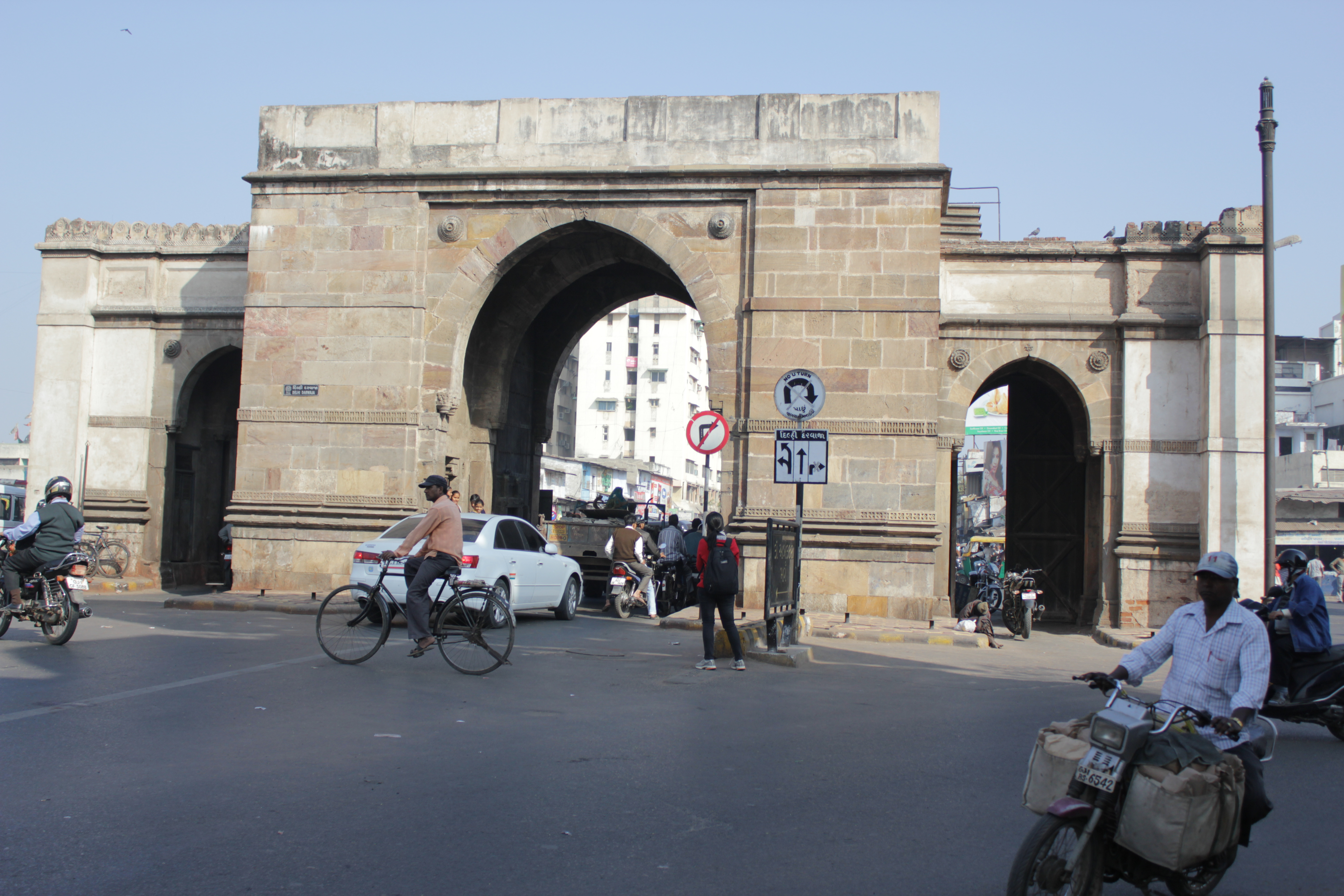
Delhi gate

- Delhi gate (23°2′16″N 72°35′16″E): Formerly known as Idariyo Gate, the doors of iron-plated timber, the gateway of three stone arches fifteen feet broad and twenty-two high with a roofed platform 32x20 pierced for one gun. In 1878, on either side of the main gateway, two openings, each 8 feet wide and 16 high were added for foot passengers at a cost of £489 (Rs. 4890). (ASI MNI No. N-GJ-15)

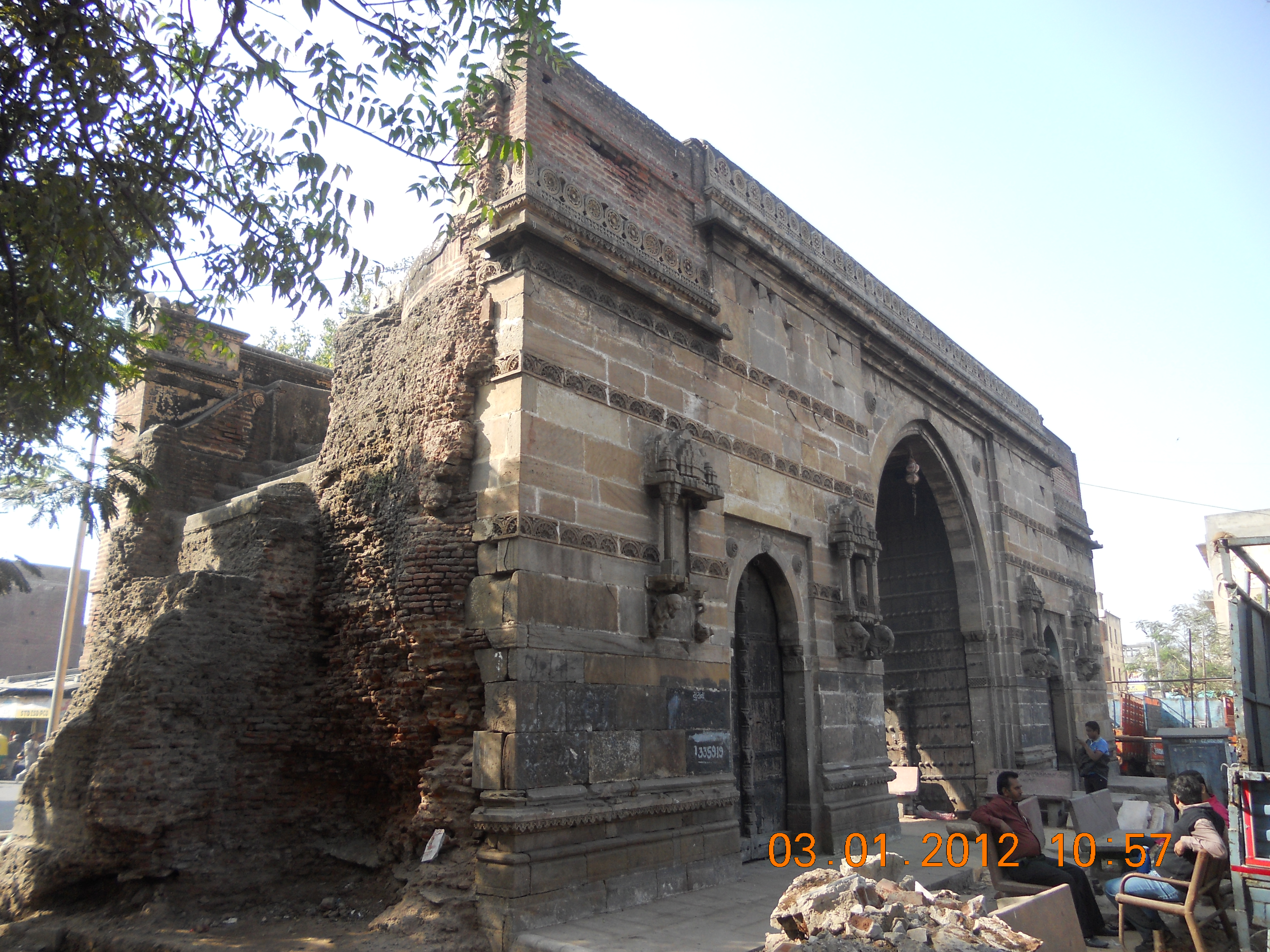
Dariyapur gate

- Dariyapur gate (23°2′14″N 72°35′34″E): the doors of iron-plated timber, the gateway of three stone arches the largest twenty-two feet high with a roofed platform 30x11. (ASI MNI No. N-GJ-21)
- Kalupur gate (23°1′51″N 72°35′52″E): the doors of iron-plated timber, the gateway of three stone arches twenty-seven feet high with a roofed platform 32x16 and pierced for two guns. (ASI MNI No. N-GJ-19)
- Sarangpur gate (23°1′21″N 72°35′53″E): doors of iron-plated timber, a gateway of three stone arches twenty-six feet high and fifteen broad and a roofed platform 33 X16, pierced for three guns. (ASI MNI No. N-GJ-20)

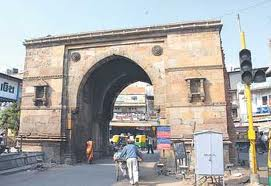
Raipur gate

- Raipur gate (23°1′2″N 72°35′41″E): doors of iron-plated timber, a gateway of three stone arches twenty-six feet high and nineteen broad and a roofed platform 32 x 20, pierced for three guns. (ASI MNI No. N-GJ-37)

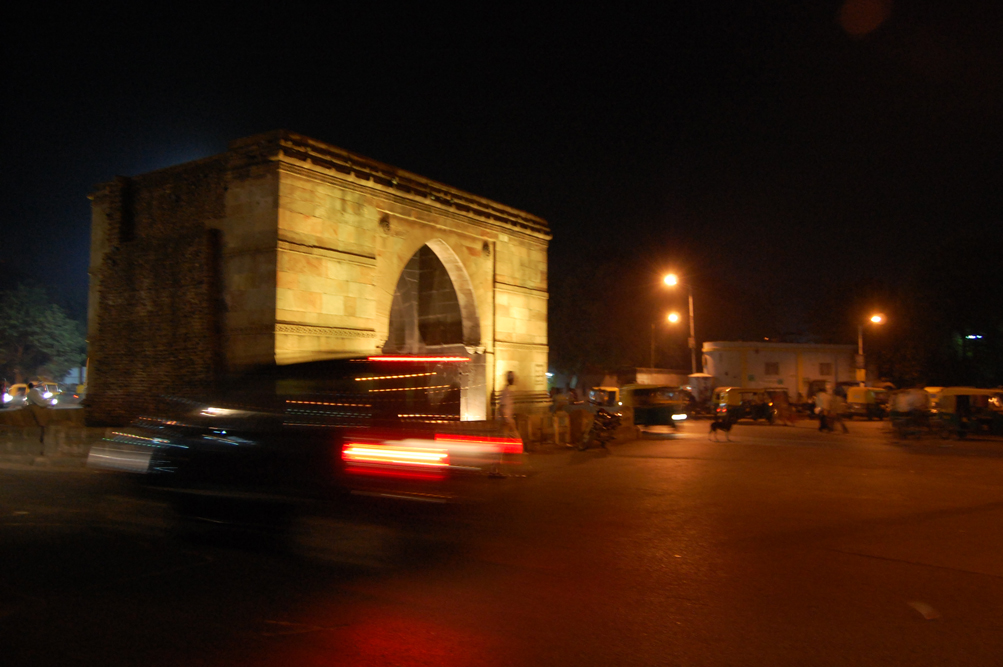
Astodiya gate

- Astodiya gate (23°1′0″N 72°35′27″E): doors of iron-plated timber, the gateway of three stone arches seventeen feet broad and twenty-five high with a platform 28x27, pierced for three guns. Now traffic island. (ASI MNI No. N-GJ-35)
- Mahuda gate with a roofed platform 30x21 and twenty feet high. This gateway was ill-omened and was built up and never used. It is spoken of as the Shut, Bandh, gate, and is probably the Dhedriah gate mentioned in the Mirat-i-Ahmadi. Lost but rebuilt later.
- Jamalpur gate (23°0′44″N 72°34′53″E): a gateway of three stone arches twenty-two feet broad and twenty-seven high and a roofed platform 32 X 27, pierced for one gun.
- Khan Jahan gate (23°1′0.53″N 72°35′27.34″E): An arched gateway, iron plated doors and an open platform 26x20 and twenty-two feet high. It was near this gate that in 1780 the British breached the wall and took the city by assault.
- Raikhad gate (23°1′8.56″N 72°34′43.91″E): 2050 feet north of the Khan Jahan gate, has three stone arches and an iron-plated door. Access to river in the past.
- Manek gate: North of Raikhad and about 158 feet south-east of Ganesh is the Manek gate which is small in size and has stone steps. Now lost.
- Khanpur gate (23°1′48″N 72°34′37″E), the doors of iron-plated timber, the gateway of three stone arches twenty-four feet high by seventeen broad with a roofed platform 31 X20.
- Other Bhadra gates: the three citadel gates, Ganesh, Ram, and Baradari in the centre.

Two new gates added by British after the opening of railways connecting Bombay in 1864 to facilitate the movement of public.

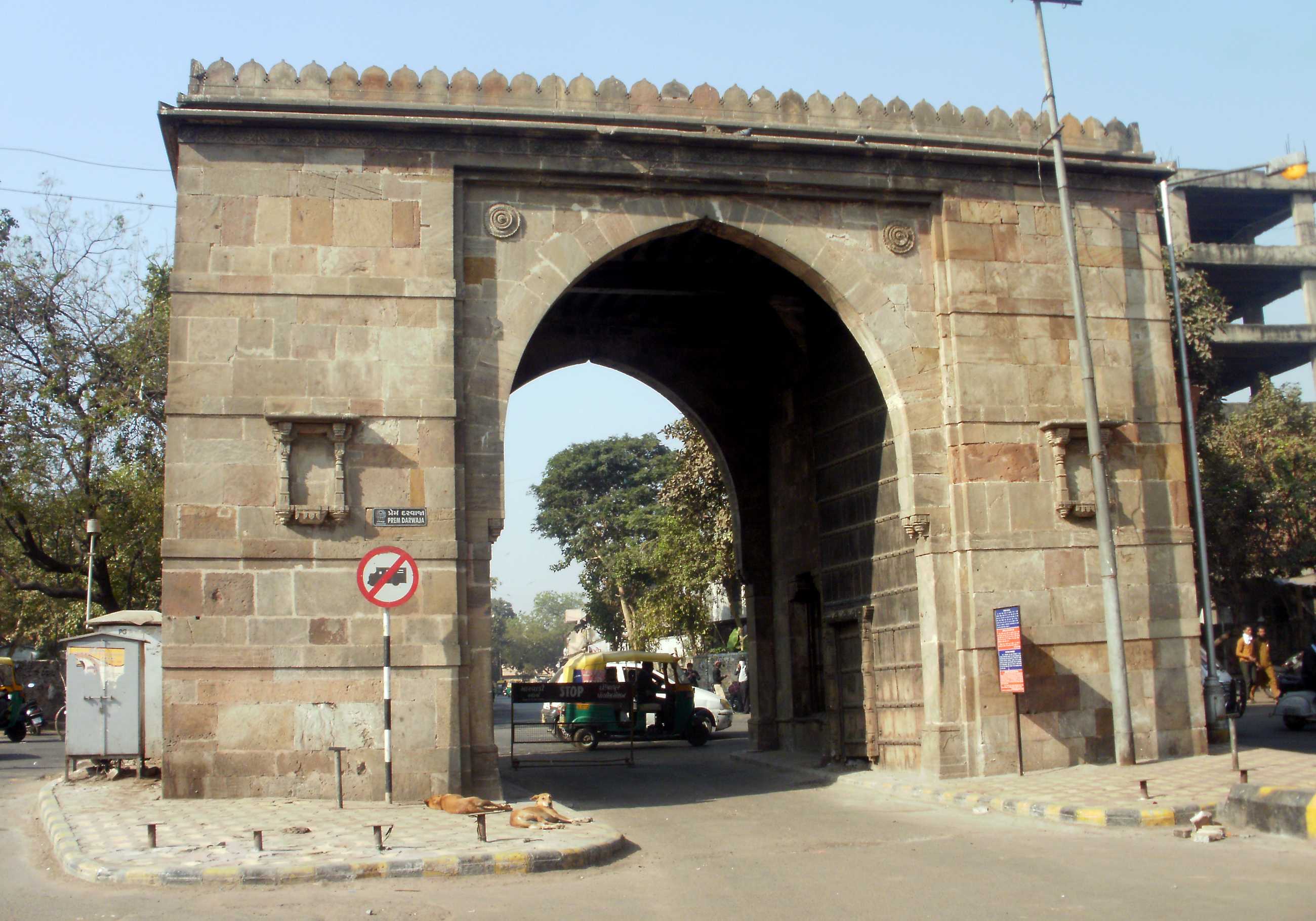
Prem Darwaja

- Prem Darwaja (23°2′6″N 72°35′48″E): Formerly Premabhai Gate, Saracenic in style, 16 feet broad and as many high, was built in 1864 at a cost of £914 (Rs. 9140). (ASI MNI No. N-GJ-22)

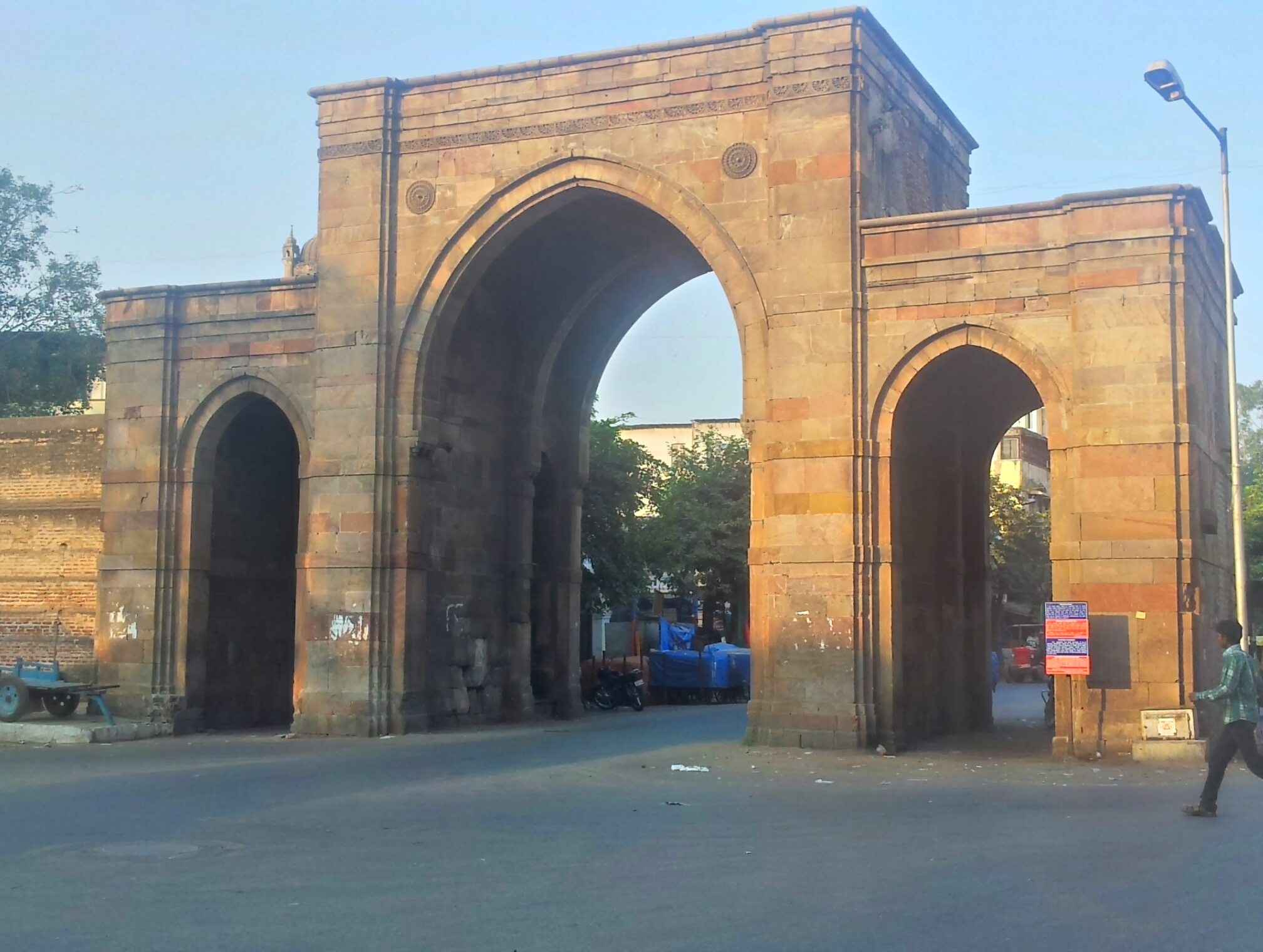
Panchkuva Darwaja

- Panchkuva gate (23°1′30″N 72°35′49″E): At a cost of £1115 (Rs. 11,450), built in 1871 for easy access to the railway station. Three gateways of pointed arches, the central one 18 feet wide and 28 feet high; and each side gateway 7 feet wide and 19 high. (ASI MNI No. N-GJ-10)

=== Other gates ===
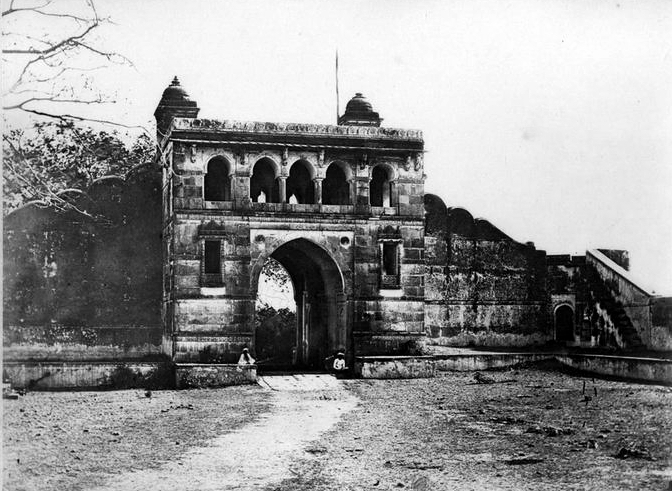
Shah-e-Alam gate in 1880s

Kharu gate was built near Karanj to give soldiers addition post. Halim ni Khidki (23°2′18″N 72°35′2″E) was a small window gate in north. There were gates which gave entry into suburbs of Ahmedabad: Gomtipur gate and Shah-e-Alam gate of Shah-e-Alam's Roza.

== Gallery ==
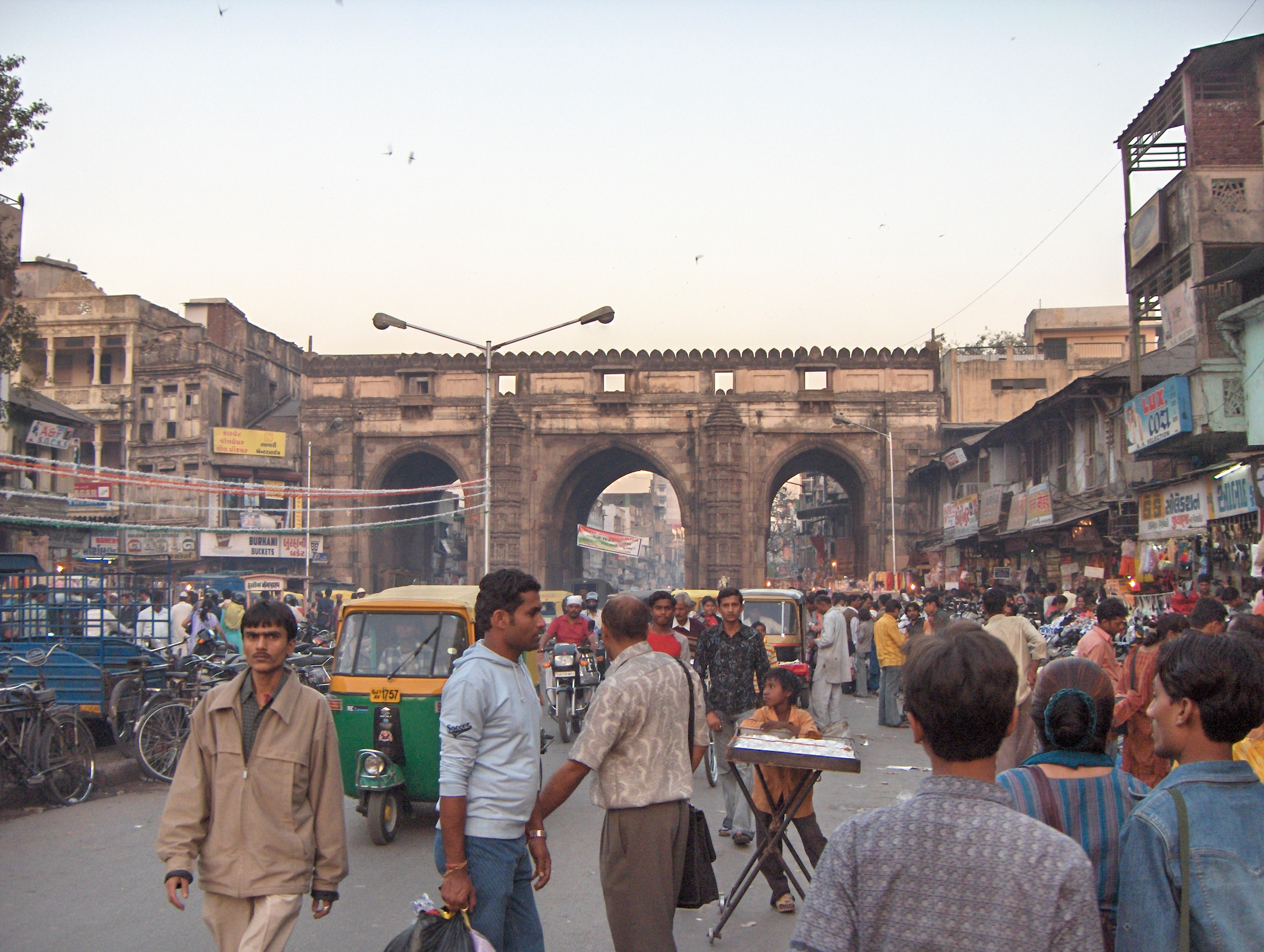
Teen Darwaja

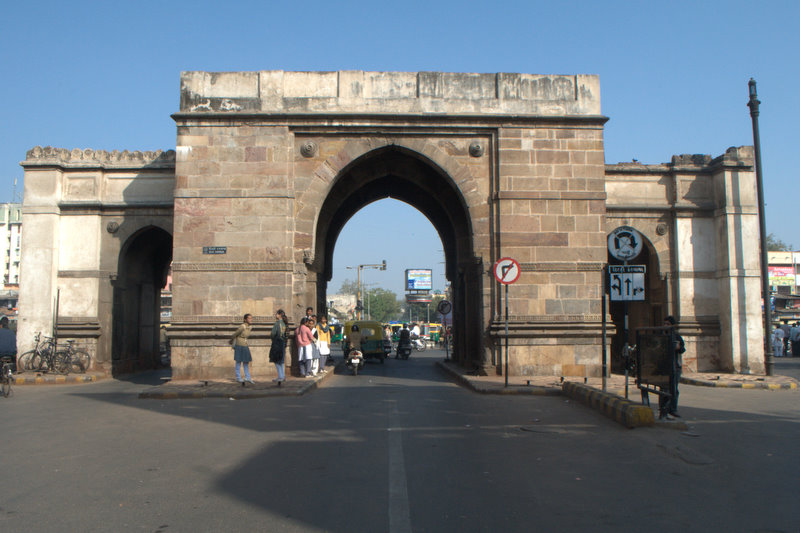
Delhi Darwaja

== See also ==
- Ahmedabad
- Fort and Gates of Ahmedabad
- History of Ahmedabad
- List of gates in India
- Teen Darwaza
