= Maneknath =

Hindu saint

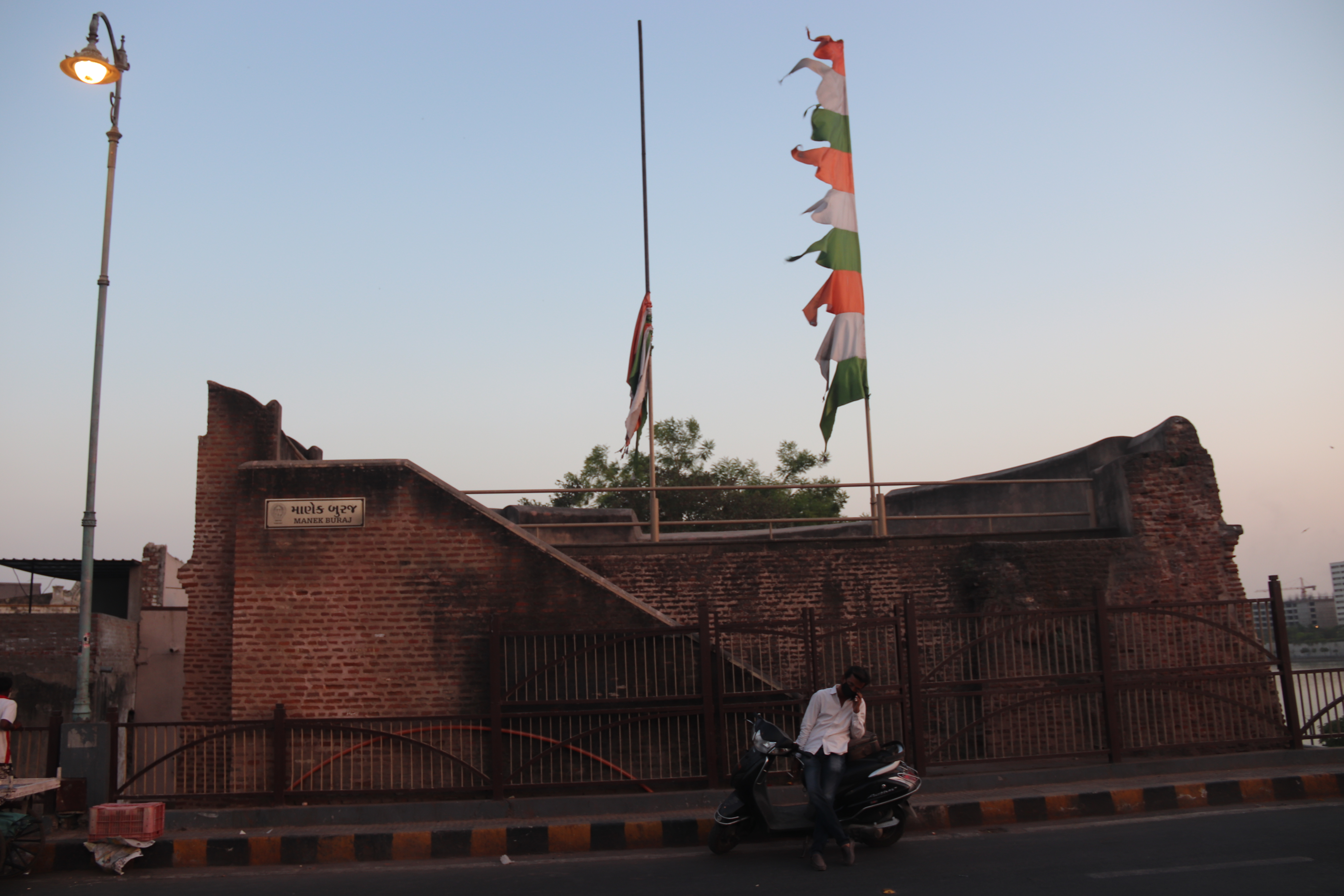
Manek Burj

Baba Maneknath was 15th century legendary Hindu saint who lived on the banks of Sabarmati River near present city of Ahmedabad, Gujarat, India.

== Legend ==
Saint Maneknath interrupted and helped Ahmad Shah I built Bhadra Fort in 1411. He wove a mat during day while the fort walls were constructed, he then unweaved the mat at night, magically crumbling down the walls. When this was discovered, he was invited to prove his powers to Ahmed Shah, by putting himself into a kettle. When he did, Ahmed Shah sealed the openings of the kettle. On the other account he helped the king to locate the site from where the construction of fort started. Under his advice the architect of city walls, Ahmad Khattu changed the layout of city. He was buried alive or took samadhi on the river island when Sabarmati River was passing through the city under Fernandez Bridge. The first quarter of the city, Manek Chowk, named after him and the memorial temple is situated there. The first bastion of the fort named after him, called Manek Burj, situated at the east end of Ellis Bridge.

The saint is revered in north and central Gujarat. Bharathari near Thasra in Kheda district also has his memorial where he is shown seated on his horse and is considered the patron saint of the village. There is a temple at Latol near Danta in Banaskantha district is located near the cave in the foothill where the saint is believed to have meditated. His another main place is located behind Hotel Ellora in Ambaji banaskantha district where Maneknath is truly seated, where his divine realization is felt, there is also the glory of the place, where his idol and trident are, where he is considered a protector saint who guided people towards truth, self-discipline, and devotion. It is believed that the realization of Gurudev saint shree guru maneknath takes place in the Thursday aarti.In the form of shri Himanshu Pandya, who is the ninth recipient of his blessings, he is a worshipper of gurudev.

== Descendants ==
Mahant Ghanshyamnath, the 12th generation descendant of the saint, performs puja and hoists the flag on Manek Burj on the foundation day of the city and Vijayadashami every year.
