= Manek Burj =

- માણેક બુરજ
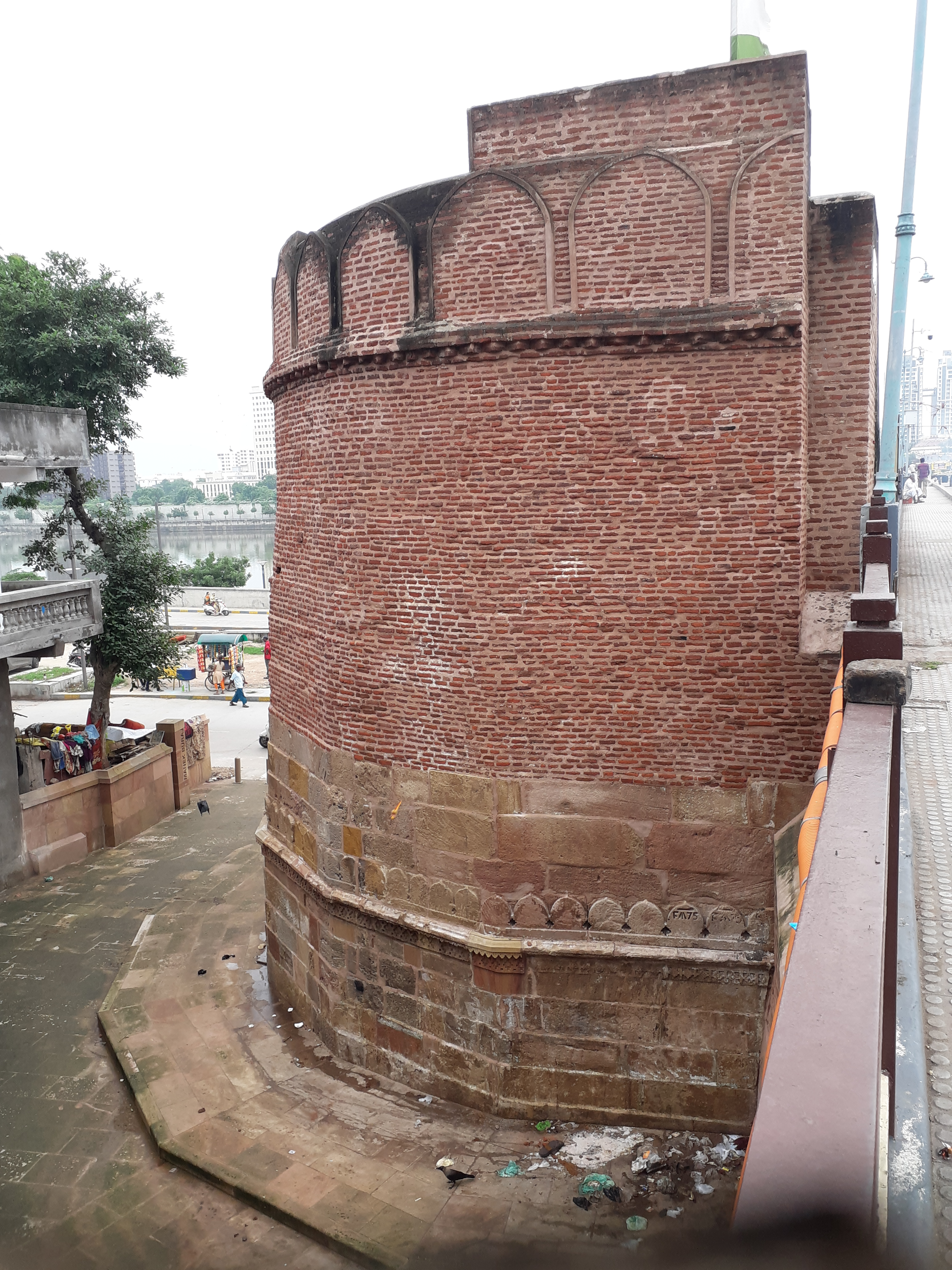
- Manek Burj from Ellis Bridge
- Location of Manek Burj in Ahmedabad
- Etymology: Maneknath

General information
- Type: Bastion of the city wall
- Location: East end of Ellis Bridge, Ahmedabad, India
- Coordinates: 23.0221373°N 72.577357°E
- Named for: Maneknath
- Construction started: 1411
- Renovated: 2003

Height
- Height: 53 foot (16 m)

Dimensions
- Circumference: 77 foot (23 m)

Technical details
- Material: Bricks and mortar

Manek Burj, also spelled Manek Buraj (lit. 'Ruby bastion') is the foundation bastion of Bhadra Fort in the old city of Ahmedabad, Gujarat, India. The Burj is associated with legendary saint Maneknath.

== Etymology ==
Manek Burj is named after the legendary 15th-century Hindu saint, Maneknath, who intervened to help Ahmed Shah I build Bhadra Fort in 1411.

== History ==
Manek Burj was the original bastion of Ahmedabad. It was built around the foundation stone of the city, laid by Ahmed Shah I on 26 February 1411. The bastion is 53 feet (16 m) high on the outside. It once contained a roofed stepwell with a circumference of 77 feet (23 m), the Manek Kuva. The well was filled and sealed in 1866 after the Sabarmati River changed its course, causing the Manek Kuva to run dry. A water channel near the bastion once brought water to the royal baths.

In 1869, Ellis Bridge, the city's first bridge across the Sabarmati River, was constructed near the bastion. In May 1989, the Ahmedabad Municipal Corporation declared Ellis Bridge and its boundary, Manek Burj, and the natural water drain near one of the banks of the Sabarmati river protected sites.

The original Ellis Bridge was narrow, and not suited for heavy motorized traffic. It was closed in 1997, and in 1999 a new concrete bridge was constructed on either side of the 19th century steel structure. Manek Burj was partially demolished to make way for the bridge expansion.

After the 2001 Gujarat earthquake, and the riots in 2002, many believed that the city had suffered as a result of the damage to the bastion. Manek Burj was restored in 2003.

== Culture ==
Chandan and Rajesh Nath, 13th generation descendants of Saint Maneknath, perform puja and hoist the flag at Manek Burj on Ahmedabad's Foundation Day and for the Vijayadashami festival every year.

== Gallery ==
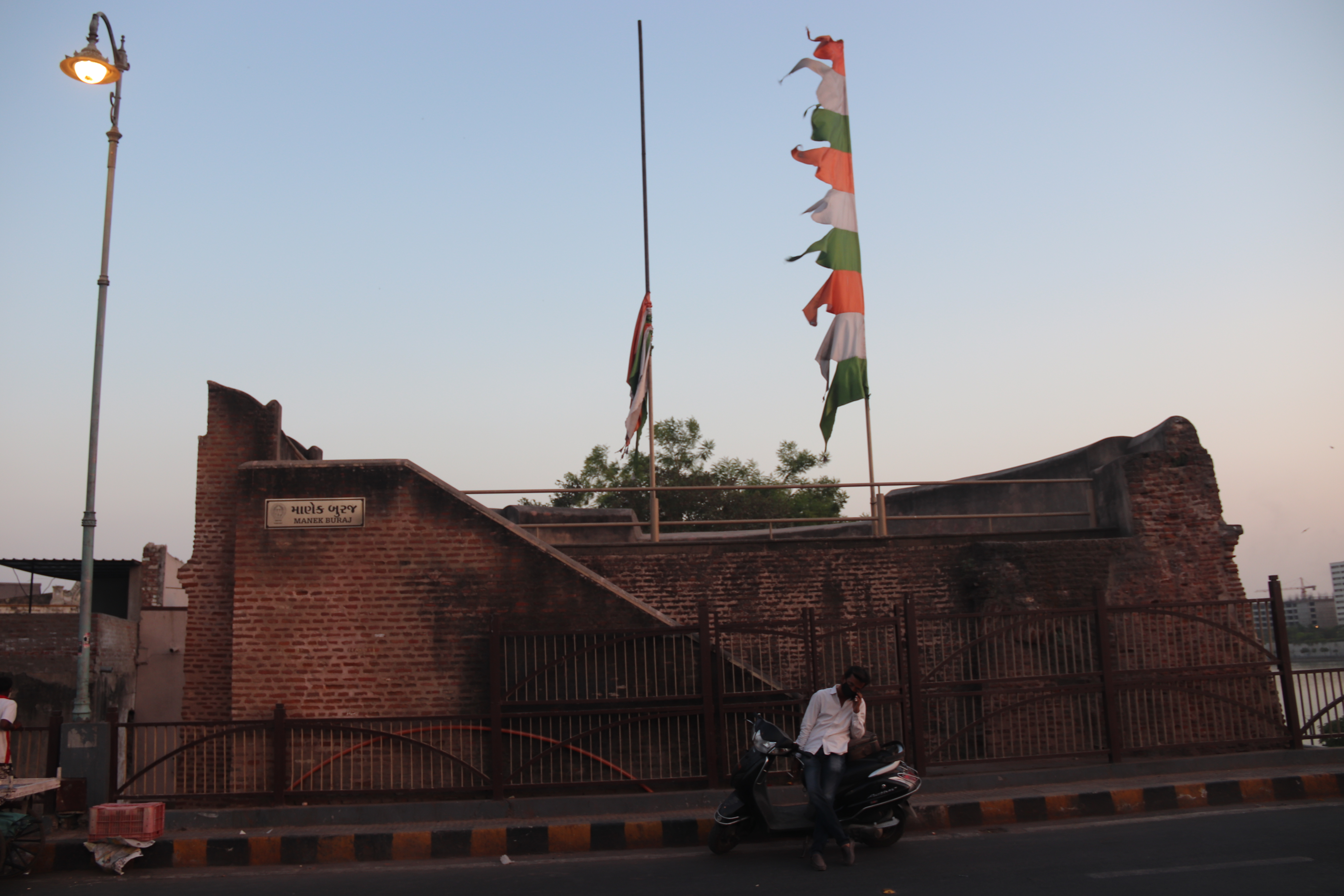
From north

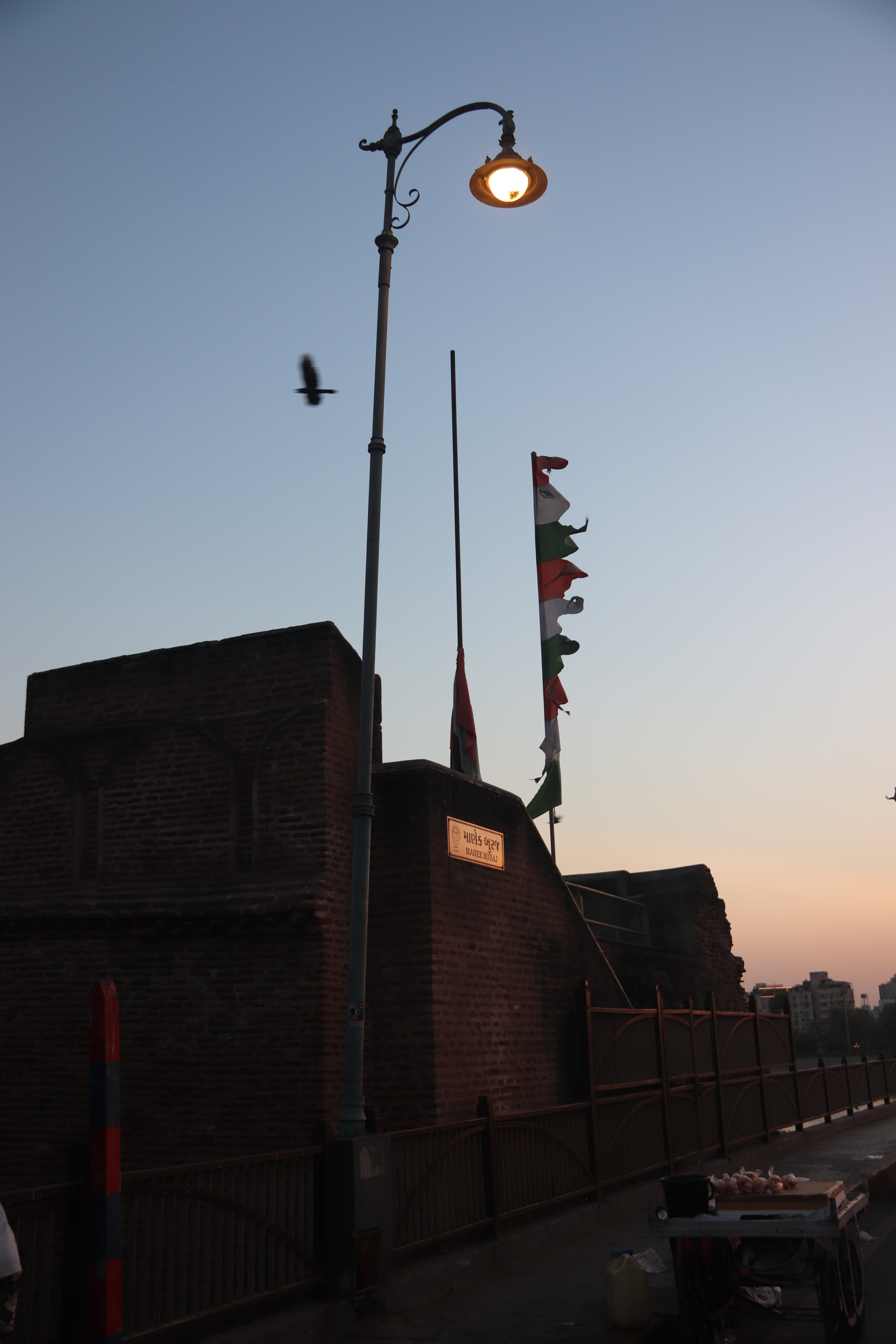
In evening

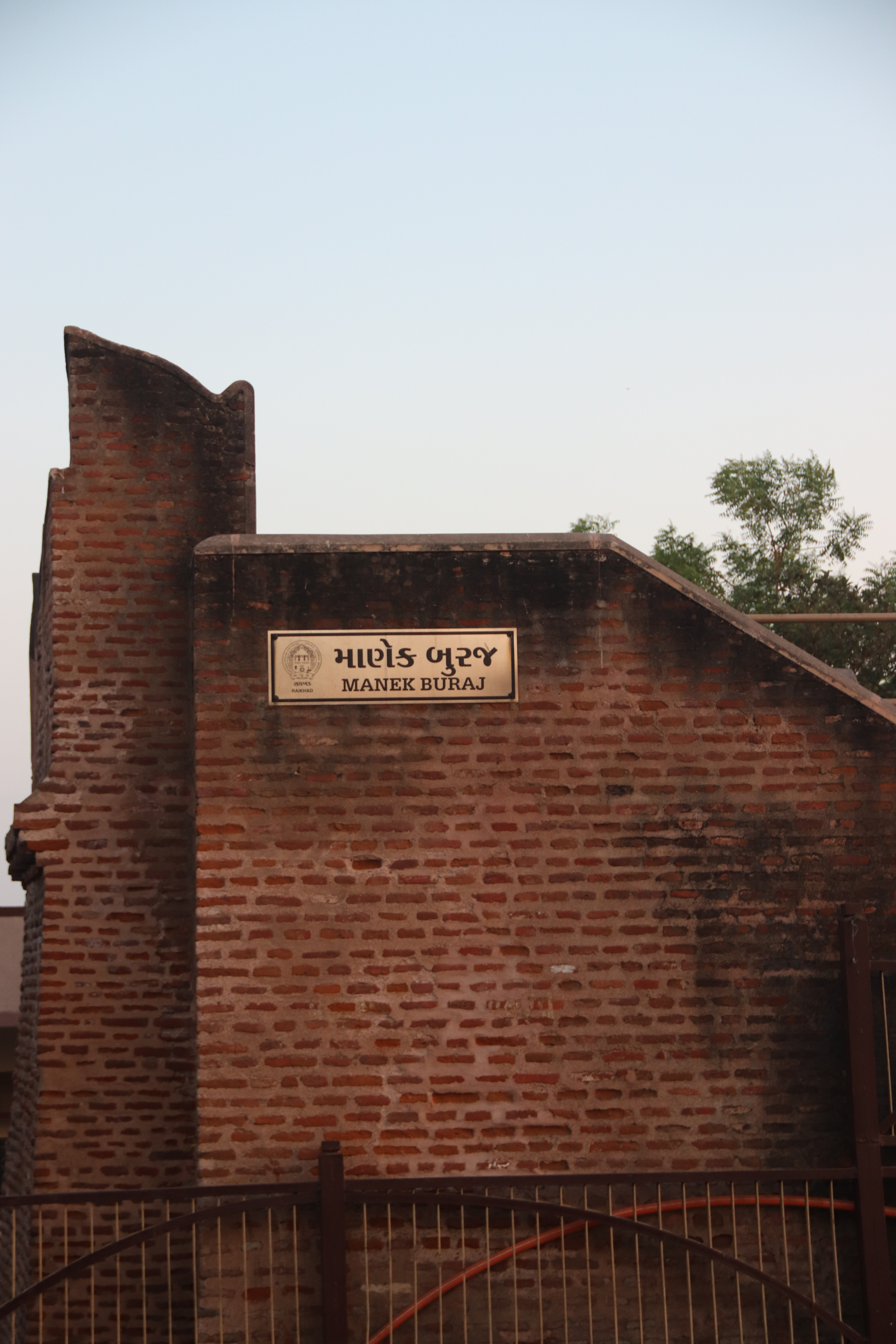
Staircase leading to the roof of the Burj

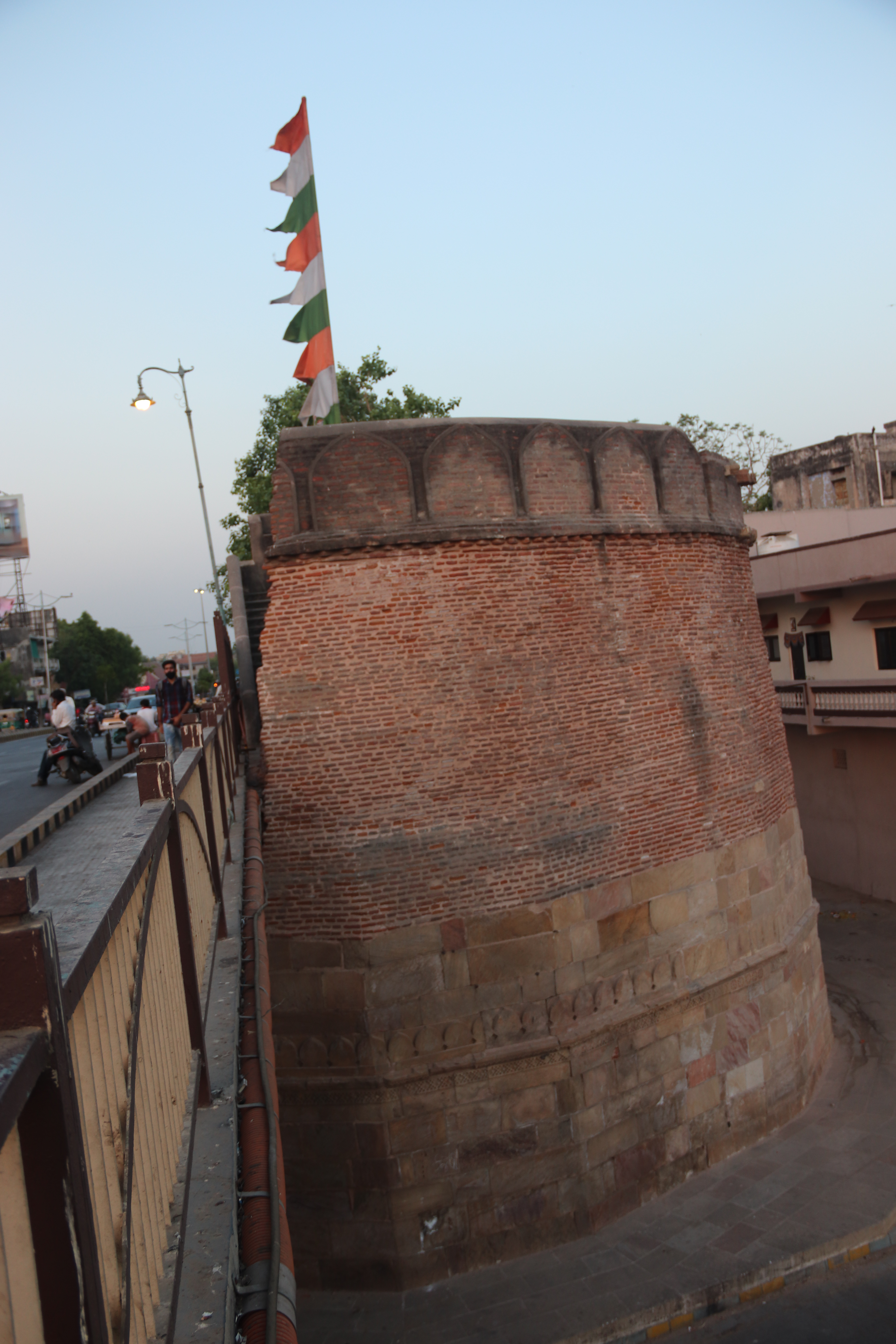
From south
