= 2017 Gujarat flood =

Floods in India

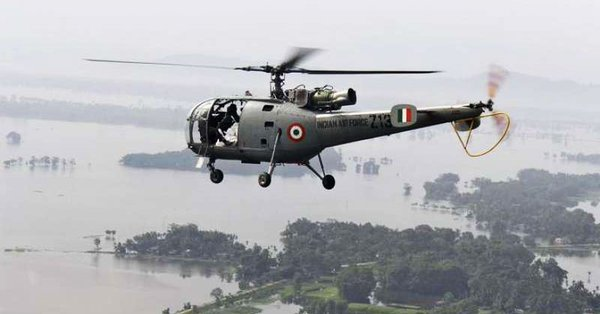
- A helicopter deployed by the Indian Air Force for rescue
- Date: 1 June 2017–31 July 2017
- Location: Gujarat and Rajasthan, India
- Deaths: At least 224 (in Gujarat) + 16 (from Rajasthan)

Following heavy rain in July 2017, the Indian state of Gujarat was affected by severe flooding. The floods were reported to have caused total 224 deaths between 1 June and 31 July 2017. 16 people had died in neighbouring Rajasthan state by 31 July.

== Information ==
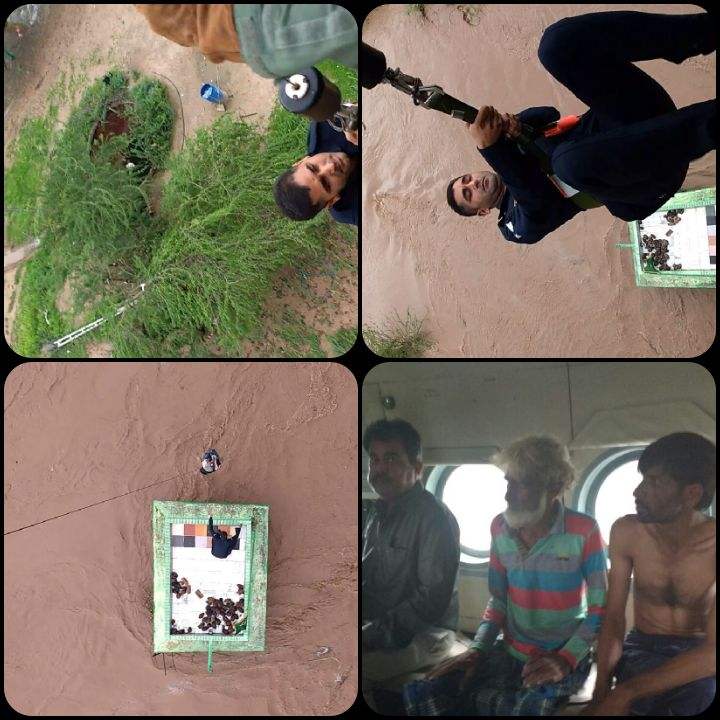
Indian Air Force rescue operation

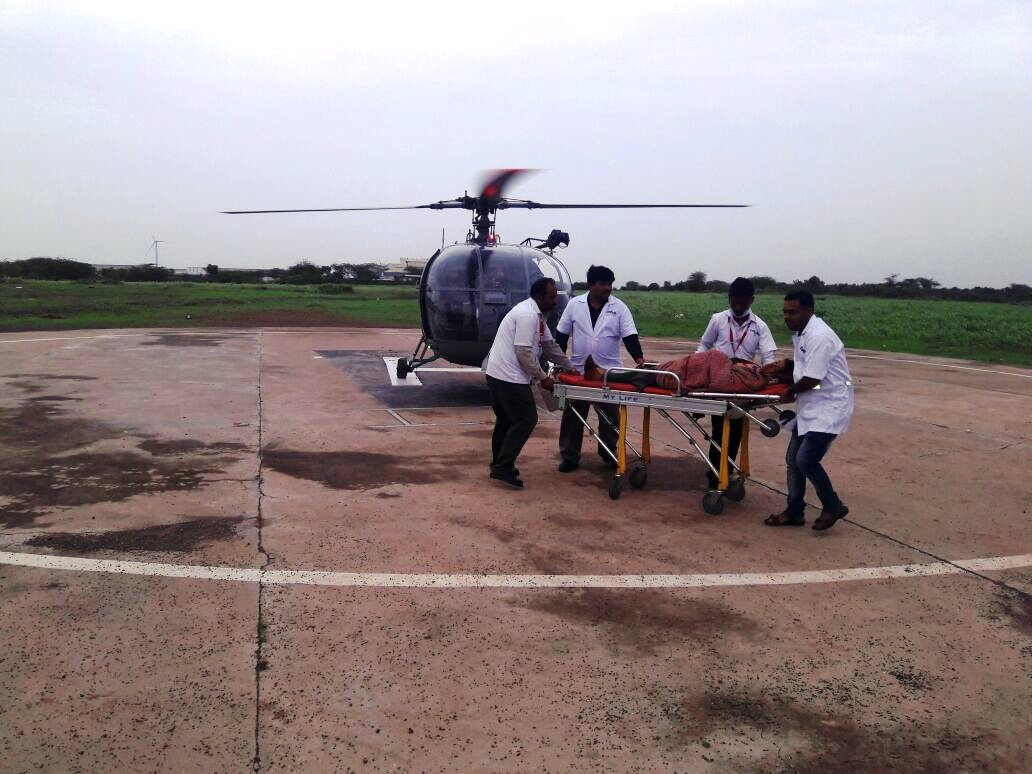
Medics transporting rescued person

The monsoon season in Gujarat typically starts in mid-June. In the 2017 season low pressure systems developed over the Arabian Sea and the Bay of Bengal simultaneously, resulting in heavy rainfall. Moderate rain began across the state on 14 July, and heavy rains fell from 21 to 25 July.

== Flooding of Gujarat ==
According to the Indian Meteorological Department data, between 1 and 28 July, Gujarat received 559.4 mm of rainfall, as against the average of 339.6 mm for the said period, representing an excess of 65%. The districts of Banaskantha, Patan, Gandhinagar, Morbi, Surendranagar, Mehsana and Sabarkantha received 267%, 208%, 189%, 174%, 172%, 130% and 115% respectively of their average rainfall for the same period. The districts in north Gujarat received more than 200 mm of rainfall in 24 hours on 24 July. Dhanera recorded 235 mm rainfall in six hours on 24 July resulting in severe flooding. Deesa recorded 269 mm rain while Idar recorded 151 mm on 25 July. Sabarkantha received highest rains in Gujarat at 219 mm, followed by Banaskantha with 150 mm. It was close to the heaviest rainfall in 112 years in the affected region.

As of 1 August, at least 224 people had died in floods in Gujarat since 1 June due to rain-related causes. Among them, 61 deaths were recorded in Banaskantha, 18 in Ahmedabad, 14 in Surendranagar, 11 in Chhota Udaipur, 10 in Surat district. As of 31 July, 16 people had died in neighbouring Rajasthan state. More than 4,000 cattle died in Banaskantha district. The electricity supply to 753 villages were cut off. The road and rail transport were also affected. Over 370 roads, including six National Highways, and 153 State Highways and 674 Panchayat roads were flooded and closed for vehicular traffic. The damage is assessed at ₹10 crore (US$1.0 million) for National Highways and ₹26 crore (US$2.7 million) for State Highways. 11 out of 20 trains operating between Mumbai-Delhi were cancelled due to damage to tracks near Palanpur. 915 GSRTC bus trips were cancelled in northern districts. There was breach in Narmada Canal near Thara, Gujarat in Banaskantha. The runway of Ahmedabad airport was damaged and two Air India flights were diverted. As of 26 July, of the 203 dams and reservoirs in state, 38 were full, 19 were filled to between 80 and 90% of their capacity, 15 to between 70%–80% and 130 were filled to less than 70% capacity. 25% of Kharif crop sowing in Gujarat, especially and Saurashtra and north Gujarat was lost.

== Relief and rescue ==
More than 113,000 people were evacuated to safety and more than 17,000 of them were rescued with the help of the Indian Army, Indian Air Force (IAF), the Border Security Force (BSF), the National Disaster Response Force (NDRF) and the State Disaster Response Force (SDRF). Ten IAF helicopters, five Army columns, 18 BSF teams and 32 teams from the NDRF, 11 teams from the SDRF and the local teams were deployed for rescue and relief operations. Over 2,000,000 food packets were distributed in affected districts in north Gujarat. 12,000 people were moved to safety and at least 100 people were rescued in Rajasthan. 90 relief camps were set up for affected people. The electricity supply was restored in 700 villages. More than 1,500 sanitation workers were deployed in Banaskantha and Patan districts to prevent outbreaks. And more than 10,400 carcasses were disposed.

Around 2 lakh cusecs (5,700 m^{3}/s) of water was released from Dantiwada Dam on the West Banas River due to heavy inflow from Rajasthan. Dharoi Dam also released water 1.3 lakh cusec (3,700 m^{3}/s) of water in Sabarmati River, thus submerging the lower promenade of Sabarmati Riverfront in Ahmedabad. Vasna Barrage was open to release water from the river.

The Government of India announced an interim relief package of ₹500 crore (US$52 million). It is also announced that ex gratia of ₹2 lakh (US$2,100) be given to the next of kin of the deceased and ₹50,000 (US$520) to people seriously injured in the floods.

== See also ==
- 2017 Northeast India floods
- 2017 West Bengal floods
- 2021 Saurashtra flood
