= Sabarmati Riverfront =

Development at Ahmedabad, India

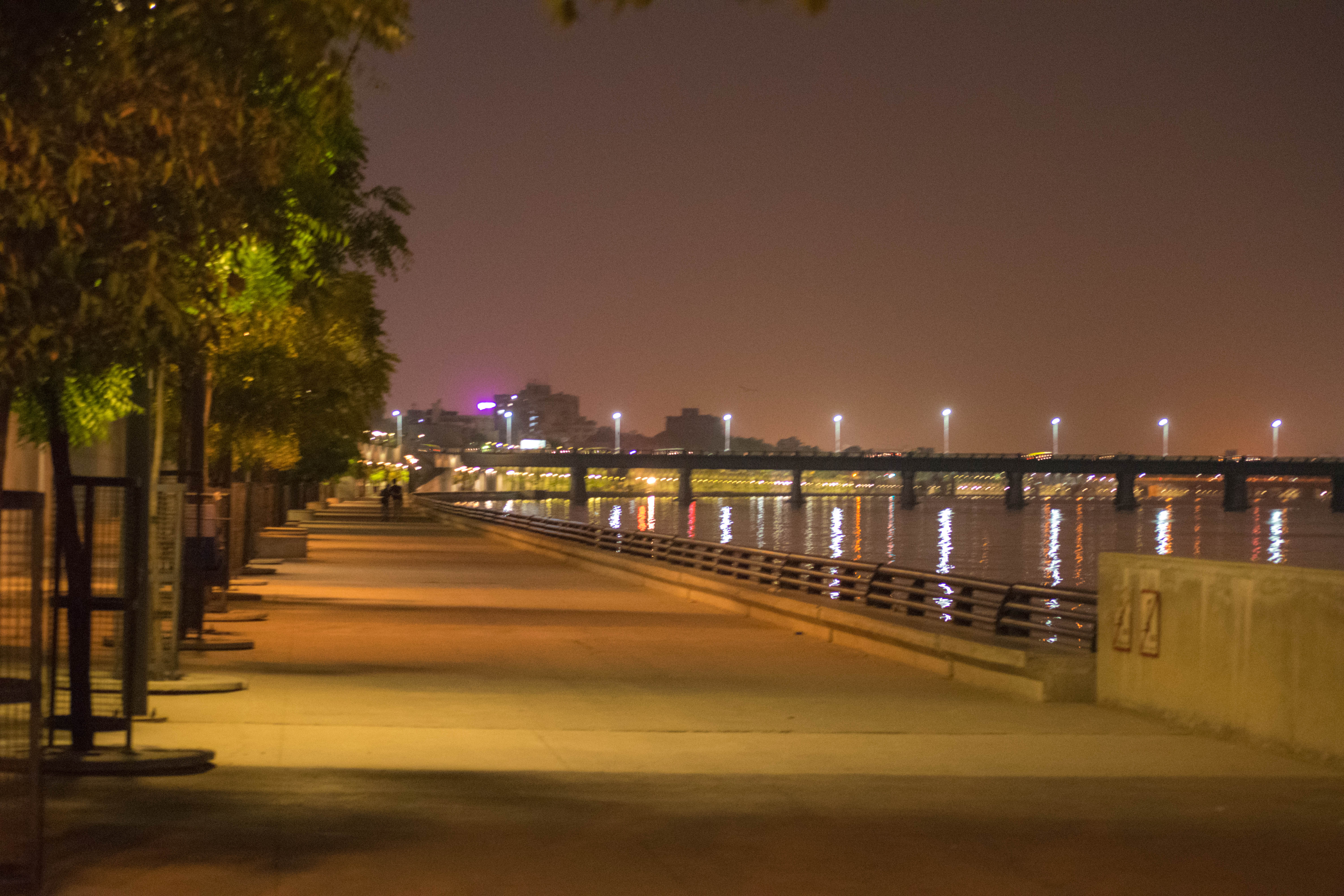
- Interactive map of Sabarmati Riverfront
- Location: Ahmedabad, Gujarat, India
- Coordinates: 23.0341367°N 72.5723255°E
- Status: Open for Public
- Groundbreaking: 2005
- Opening: August 2012 - Ongoing
- Use: Waterfront
- Website: www.sabarmatiriverfront.com

Companies
- Architect: Bimal Patel
- Developer: Sabarmati River Front Development Corporation Limited

Technical details
- Cost: ₹1,400 crore (US$150 million) (November 2019)
- Size: Phase-1: 202.79 hectares (501.1 acres); Phase 2:108.15 hectares (267.2 acres)
- Proposed: since 1960s

Sabarmati Riverfront is a waterfront being developed along the banks of Sabarmati river in Ahmedabad, India. Proposed in the 1960s, the construction began in 2005. Since 2012, under Phase 1, the waterfront has been gradually opened to the public as facilities are constructed; various facilities are under construction. The major objectives of the project are environmental improvement, social infrastructure, and sustainable development. Phase 2 was approved in 2020.

== Geography ==
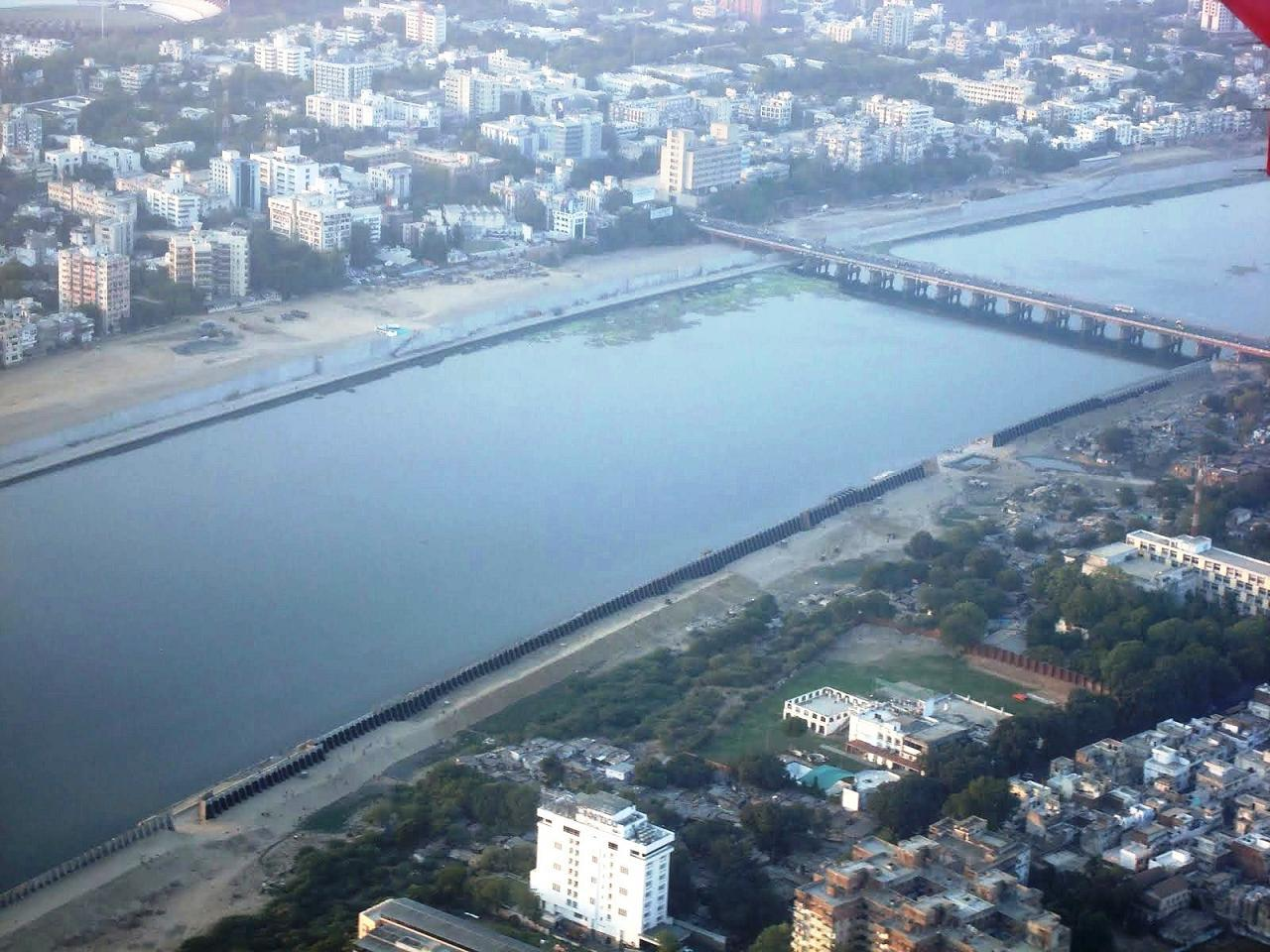
Sabarmati river and under construction promenade

The Sabarmati river is a monsoon-fed river which has a total catchment area of 21,674 square kilometres (8,368 sq mi). The Dharoi Dam constructed in 1976 upstream of Ahmedabad controls water and protects against flooding, while Vasna Barrage, constructed in 1976 downstream, retains water in the river along the city banks and diverts it through Fatehwadi canal for irrigation. The Narmada Canal, which crosses Sabarmati a few kilometres upstream from the city, is part of a larger canal network of Sardar Sarovar Dam. The canal can feed excess water to the river and maintains the level of water in the river which is retained through Vasna Barrage.

== History ==
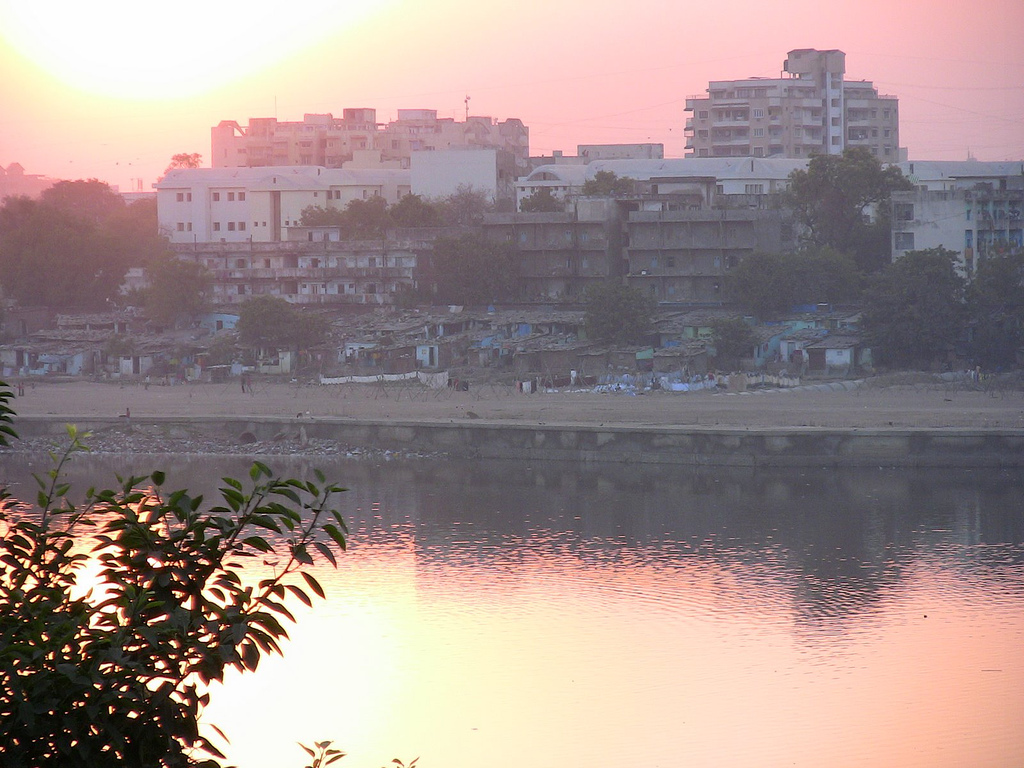
Slums on the bank before construction

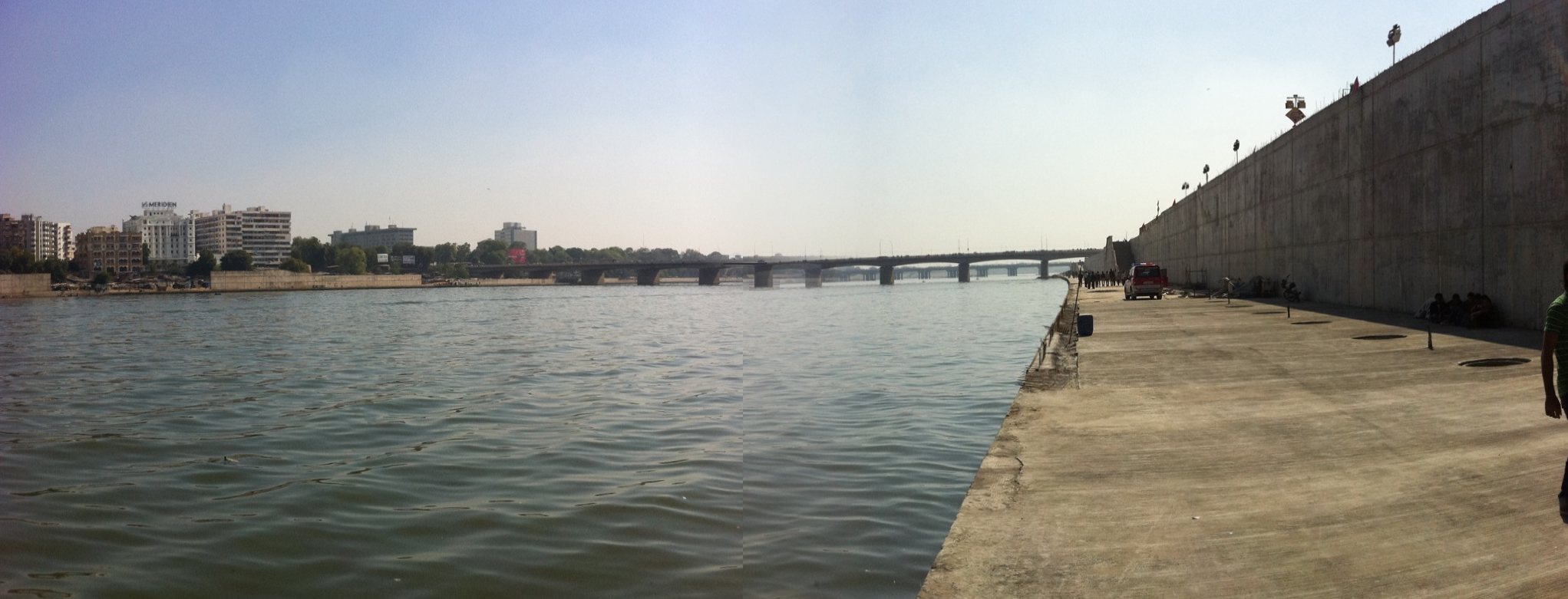
in January 2011

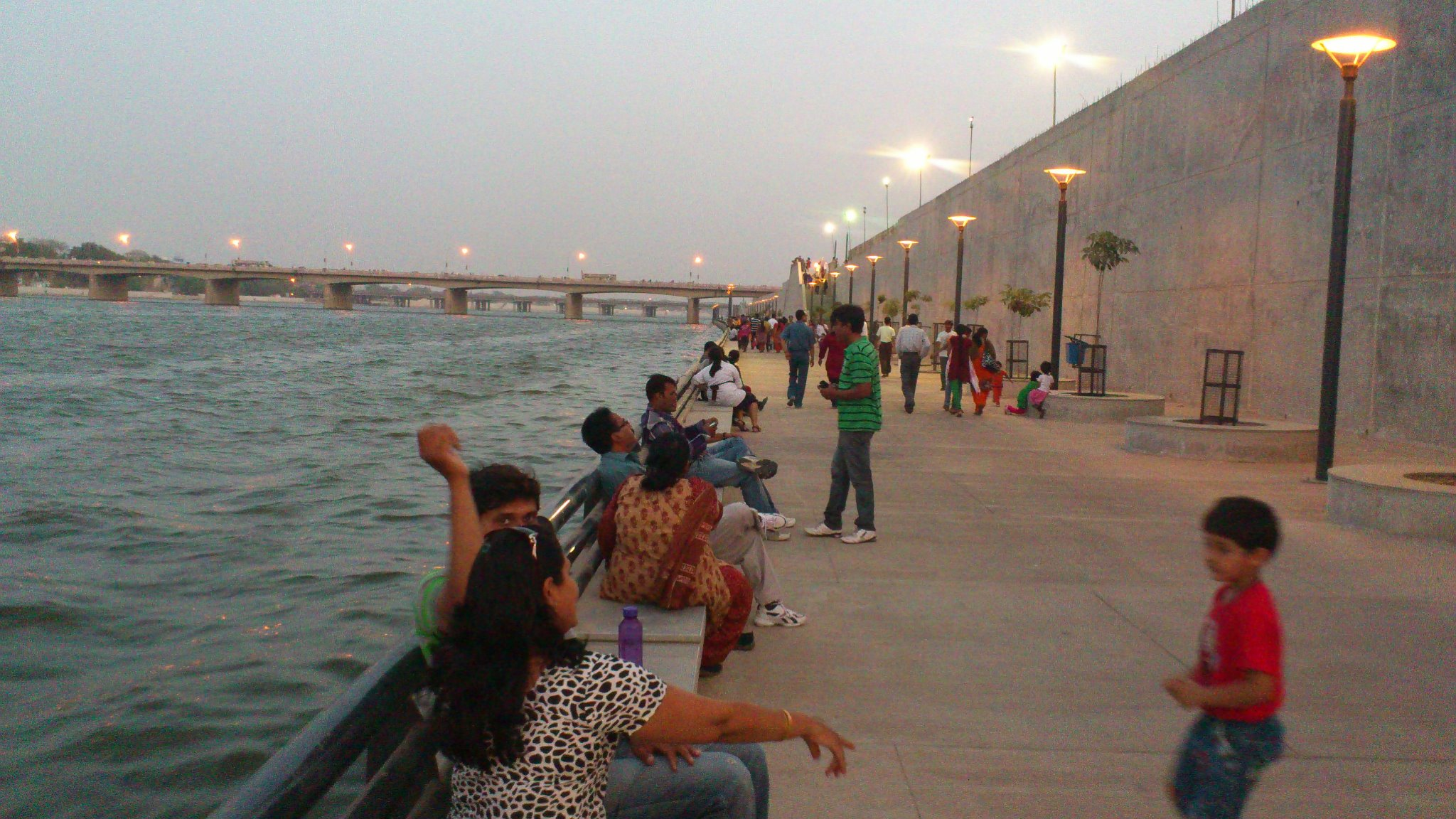
in May 2012

The first proposal for developing the riverfront was presented in 1961 by the prominent citizens of the city. French architect Bernard Kohn proposed an ecological valley in the Sabarmati basin stretched from Dharoi Dam to the Gulf of Cambay in the 1960s. In 1964, he proposed an Integrated Planning and Development of Sabarmati Riverfront by reclaiming 30 hectares (74 acres) of land. The project was considered feasible in 1966 by the Government of Gujarat. Later he distanced himself from the project citing the difference between his proposal and the project being implemented. In 1976, the Riverfront Development Group proposed an incremental approach for the construction. In 1992, the National River Conservation Plan proposed construction of sewers and pumping stations to reduce water pollution.

The Ahmedabad Municipal Corporation (AMC) set up the Sabarmati Riverfront Development Corporation Ltd (SRFDCL), a special purpose vehicle, in May 1997 funded by the Government of India with a seed capital of ₹1 crore (US$110,000) for the riverfront development. Environmental Planning Collaborative (EPC) led by Bimal Patel prepared the feasibility report in 1998. Initially the proposal was to construct the riverfront to cover a stretch of 10.4 kilometres (6.5 mi) stretch from Subhash bridge to Vasna barrage and to reclaim 162 hectares (400 acres) of the riverbed. In 2003, the project extended to cover an 11.25 kilometres (6.99 mi) stretch and reclamation of 202.79 hectares (501.1 acres) and was put on fast track. The project estimated to cost ₹1,200 crore (US$130 million) which was to be recovered by selling of a part of reclaimed land for commercial and residential purpose. Bimal Patel-led HCP Design, Planning and Management Pvt. Ltd, Ahmedabad was roped in as the main architect of the project. The project encountered several delays due to concerns regarding water level, flooding, rehabilitation of displaced slum dwellers and the opposition from the activists involved with slum rehabilitation.

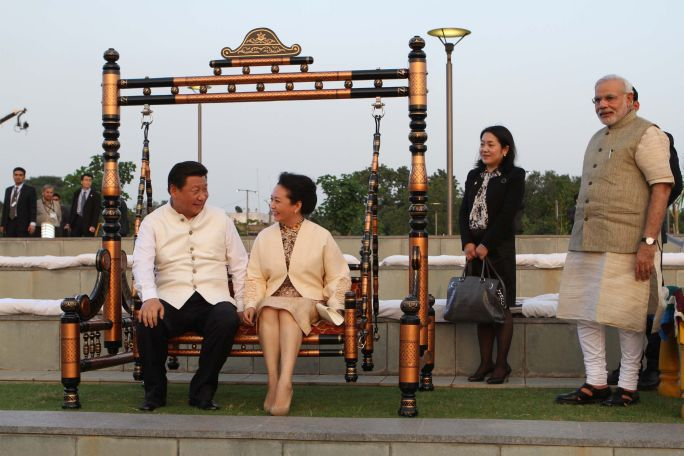
Chinese leader Xi Jinping at Sabarmati Riverfront on 17 September 2014

The construction began in 2005. The heavy engineering, land reclamation and sewage system was completed at the cost of ₹900 crore (US$96 million). The 11.5 kilometres (7.1 mi) long lower promenades on both banks are completed and some of its section were opened to the public on 15 August 2012. It was inaugurated by then state Chief Minister Narendra Modi. The waterfront is gradually opened to public as and when facilities are finished. Various facilities are actively under construction since then. Total ₹1,152 crore (US$120 million) were spent on the project by 2014. By November 2019, the ₹1,400 crore (US$150 million) were spent.

The Chinese leader, Xi Jinping and his wife Peng Liyuan visited Sabarmati riverfront with prime minister of India Narendra Modi on 17 September 2014.

== Riverfront Phase 1 ==
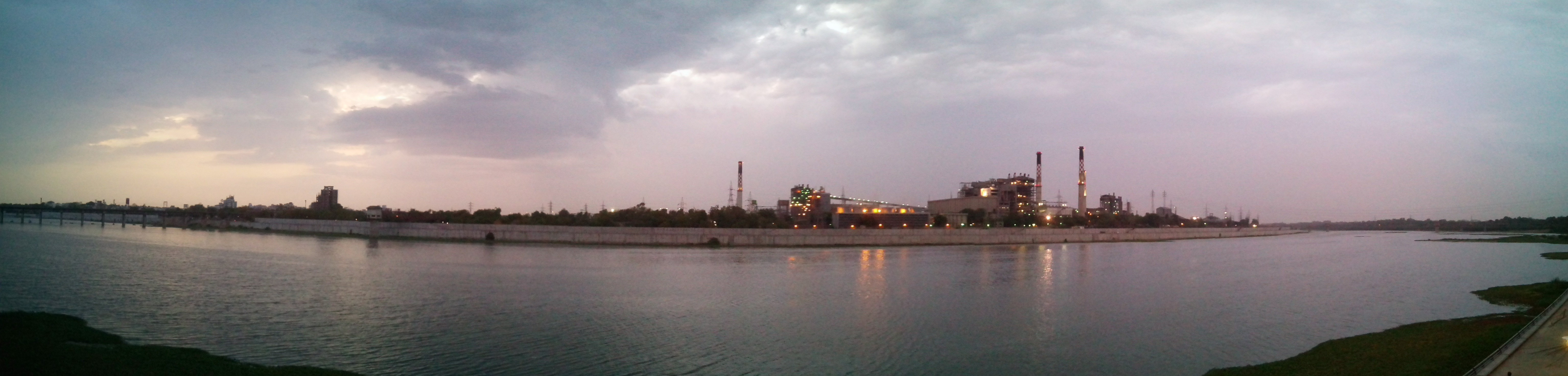
Panoramic view of Sabarmati Riverfront June 2015, Ahmedabad

The average width of the river channel was 382 metres (1,253 ft) and the narrowest cross-section 330 metres (1,080 ft). It is uniformly narrowed to 263 metres (863 ft). The project claims to have engineered the narrowing of the river without affecting its flood carrying capacity.

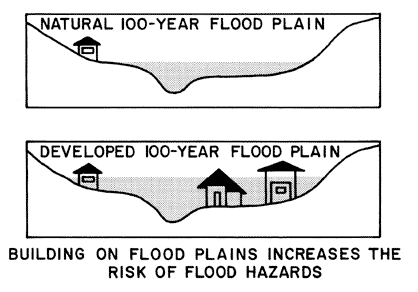
Natural vs Developed Flood Plain - image courtesy, the USGS

Flood plains, also referred to as floodplains, are lands bordering rivers and streams that are normally dry but get covered with water during floods. Buildings or other structures placed in flood plains can be damaged by floods. Development in flood plains, which includes construction of buildings; footings of bridges; or bunds, changes the pattern of water flow and increases flooding and flood damage on adjacent property by blocking the flow of water and increasing the width, depth, or velocity of flood waters.

The Sabarmati Riverfront project has reclaimed riverbed land on both the east and the west banks to construct 11.25 kilometres (6.99 mi) long riverfront. Theoretically, it can hold 470,000 cu ft/s (13,000 m^{3}/s) without spillage. Engineers are guided by the design parameters of river training through the use of scientific indices and hydrological guidelines.

A total of 202.79 hectares (501.1 acres) of land is reclaimed. The reclaimed land is used for public as well as private development. More than 85% of the reclaimed land is proposed be used for public infrastructure, recreational parks, sports facilities and gardens while nearly 14% is proposed to be used for commercial and residential purposes.

Where rivers traverse urban areas, flood-plain zoning, which places restrictions on the use of land on flood plains, can reduce the cost of flood damage. Local governments may pass laws that prevent uncontrolled building or development on flood plains to limit flood risks and to protect nearby property. On the other hand, the ever increasing demand for urban land exerts pressure on municipal bodies and urban planners to reclaim land parcels off natural flood plains. The concrete embankments specially designed for Sabarmati Riverfront were intended to reduce erosion of the banks, and reduce flooding of low-lying areas of the city by the walls constructed along both the banks. Over subsequent years, the walls built along both banks have also impeded the rapid drainage of storm water from the city into the path of the river. The width of the river designed to carry flows of 470,000 cusecs (cubic feet/second) has been reported stressed at only about 30,000 cusecs and less than 60,000 cusecs in 2025. In 2015, 500 people from the city, had to be evacuated to safer locations when flows reached 250,000 cusecs.

A new purpose-designed integrated sewage and storm-water system intercepts 38 sewage and industrial effluent discharge points and route the discharge to sewage treatment plants south of Vasna Barrage. Frequently published studies, reports and court interventions indicate large-scale untreated sewage and industrial effluents finding its way to the river. The Sabarmati Riverfront has been implemented in phases and progressively opened for public use since 2012.

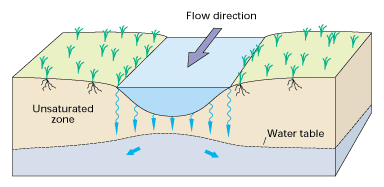
Interaction Between Groundwater and Streams, image courtesy, the USGS

The original project objectives also claimed enabling groundwater recharge. In reality, as of 2021, Ahmedabad recorded India’s third deepest water table at 67m (220 ft). After the implementation of the project, the once seasonal Sabarmati is now artificially filled up with waters brought in from a Narmada canal upstream, and the waters are held behind the Vasna Barrage downstream. A new sewage system delivers treated sewage waters of Ahmedabad city into the engineered water body from the inlet Narmada canal to the outlet at the barrage, and bound by the built embankments on either bank. It created an engineered water body and enabled recreational facilities like boating in the river. Recreational boating and kayaking, also run by SRFDCL, was halted in 2024 flagging public safety issues and contractors operating with inadequate permissions.

There are also plans to replenish the river by treated sewage water. When Sabarmati river was “emptied” in June 2025, and tens of thousands of citizens volunteered to clean-up the river bed, it became evident that much untreated water – about 786 MLD (million litres per day) - had been reaching the river beyond the sewage treatment plants each day.

=== Streets ===
New roads with footpaths, parking bays, carriage ways and cycle tracks are constructed along both the banks for easy movement of traffic along the North–South direction. The roads leading to the river are strengthened for better movement and access. The West River Drive augments the Ashram Road and has a 25 metres (82 ft) right of way. The East River Drive with a right of way of 30 metres (98 ft) provides better North–South access to the eastern part of the city and a direct road to Ahmedabad airport.

=== Recreation and amenities ===
==== Amenities ====
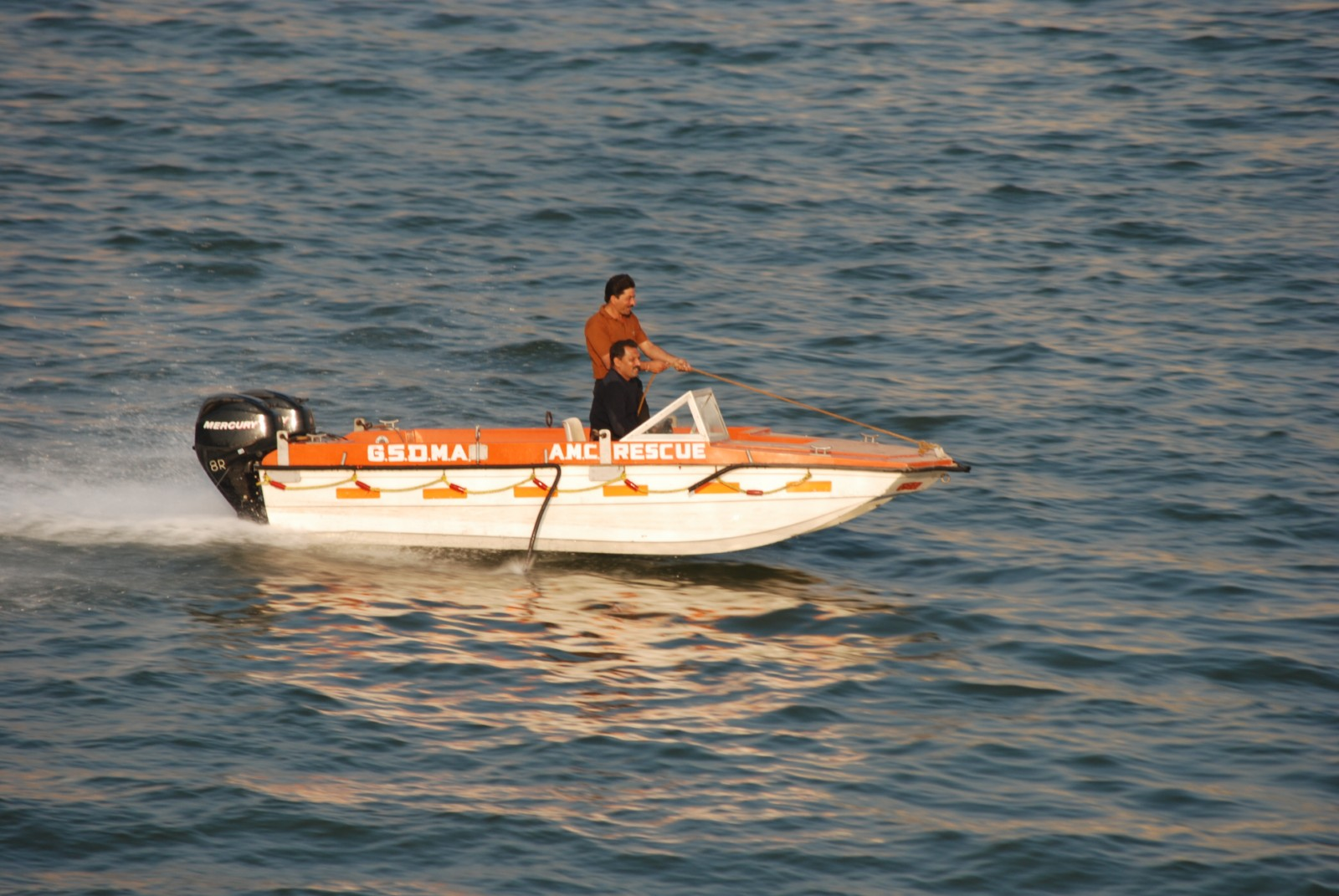
Boating

The two-level promenade is planned and the lower promenade is already constructed. These promenades provide continuous 11.2 kilometres (7.0 mi) long walkway along the river on the east side and 11.3 kilometres (7.0 mi) on west side. The width of the promenade varies from 6 to 18 metres. The 31 Ghats are constructed at regular interval along the lower promenade for access to the water. The boating stations are constructed for recreational purpose and for water-based public transport in the future. Three such stations are open.

The 5.07 hectares (12.5 acres) Events Ground is an event ground with infrastructure facilities. It serves as open venue for variety of purpose and revenue source for the project. The lawn is spread over 40,000 square metres (430,000 sq ft) and can host over 50,000 people. The 0.9 hectares (2.2 acres) laundry campus with seven blocks opened in February 2014. It has washing areas on the ground level and drying facilities on the terraces. Fourteen public utilities are constructed. A seven storey parking was opened in September 2023 near SVP Hospital.

The Sabarmati Ashram will be also connected to lower promenade and existing steps will be developed as an amphitheatre. The 3.3 ha Heritage Plaza along the city walls between Ellis Bridge and Nehru Bridge will be designed as open space showcasing heritage, history and culture of the city. Some sports complexes are also proposed.

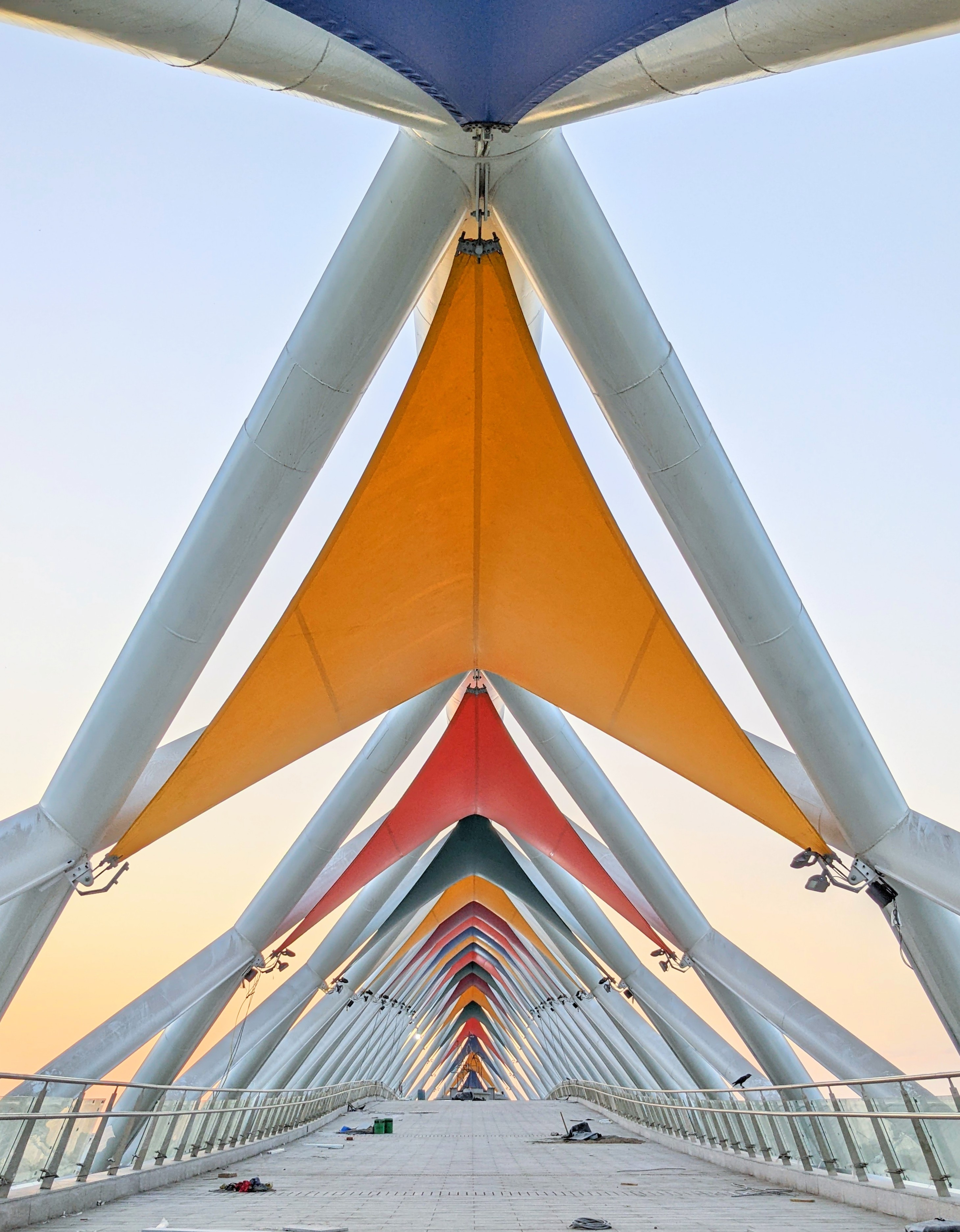
Atal bridge in April 2022

Atal Pedestrian Bridge connects both banks of the river.

==== Parks and gardens ====
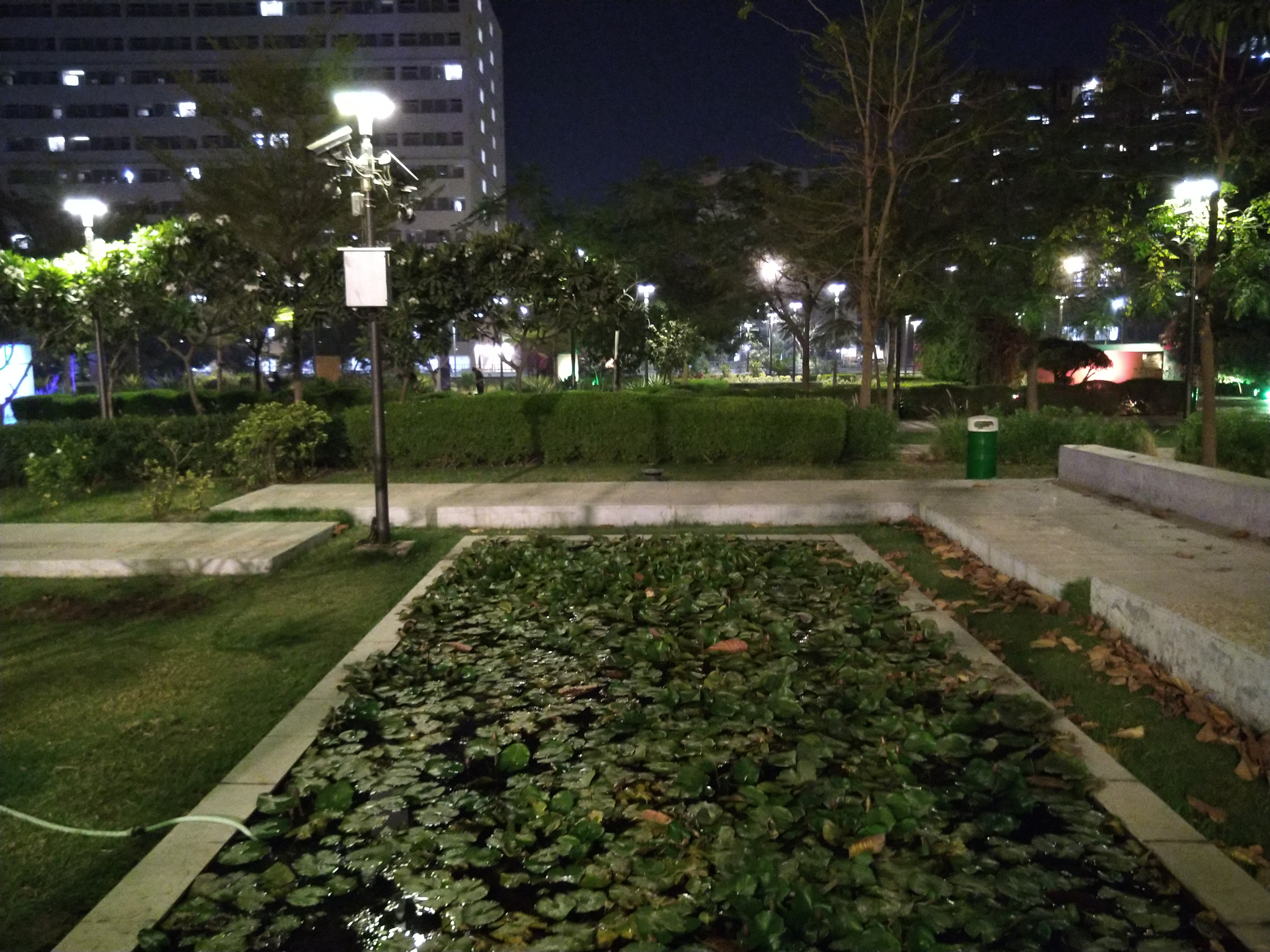
Riverfront Flower Park

Nearly 26% of the reclaimed land will be used for the parks and gardens to enhance environment and for public recreation. Some parks are already constructed and expanded while others are under construction and proposed.

The 6 ha park near Subhash Bridge built at the cost of ₹16.60 crore (US$1.8 million). It is spread over an area of 60,000 sq m, has a lotus lake, an amphitheatre, a stepwell and a 2 km long walkway. It was opened in October 2013. The 1.8 ha park near Usmanpura were opened in October 2013. The 5 ha Riverfront Flower Park, spread over 45,000 sq m, houses 330 native and exotic flower species. It was constructed at the cost of ₹18.75 crore (US$2.0 million) and opened in March 2016. The children's park near Dafnala is opened in 2019.

The 10.4 hectares (26 acres) urban forest is built in Paldi which is divided in two parts by Ambedkar Bridge. The northern part serves as garden while the southern part is a biodiversity park. It will cost ₹167 crore (US$18 million). The Riverfront Biodiversity Park, spread over two hectares of land, has around 7000 trees of over 120 species and 35 species of native as well as migratory birds such as boot-headed eagle, egrets, ibis, white-throated kingfisher, purple swamphen and sparrows. Some species of butterflies and snakes are also there. The SRFDL used the Miyawaki method of plantation with five saplings per square metre of land. It planted around 70,000 saplings on land between Ambedkar bridge and Sport Club.

The 0.9 ha amusement park is also proposed near Dadhichi bridge. The 1.4 ha Peace Garden at Khanpur is proposed as a park as well as location for concerts and outdoor performances.

==== Markets ====
Several markets, vending areas, business and event grounds are planned. Ravivari or Gujari Bazar, the informal Sunday Market held under Ellis Bridge is relocated to the new location near Gaekwad Haveli. The open air market has a functional arrangement of zones and 1641 platforms for vendors. It was opened to the public in February 2014. The 5.7 ha Exhibition Centre, a trade-fair facility, is proposed on the eastern bank of the river. The 0.5 ha plaza at Vallabh Sadan is also proposed as a market along the upper promenade.

==== Sports complexes ====
Three sports complexes are proposed; at Paldi (7.1 ha) for city-level sports, at Pirana (4.2 ha) for informal sports and at Shahpur (2.3 ha). The Paldi and Shahpur sports complexes were opened in September 2023. The venue has hosted sporting and cultural events since its opening. The sports complex was allowed to be used by the athletes of National Games in 2022, but was not offered to public due to a controversy in allotment to the Ahmedabad Tennis Association. The aquatic events under the 2022 National Games, originally planned to be held at the Sabarmati Riverfront, had to be shifted to IIT Gandhinagar due to poor water quality of Sabarmati river.

=== Residential and commercial development ===
It is planned to use nearly 14% of the reclaimed land for residential and commercial purposes. Total 52 buildings will be constructed including eight museums. For maximum usage of land, the floor space index (FSI) has been raised up to 5. The funds raised by selling the land will recover the cost of the construction and sustain the management of the riverfront. All construction will have to follow certain design guidelines. Four of these 42 proposed buildings will be 101 metres tall.

In 2017, the SRDFL attempted to sell the development rights of the land but failed. In 2020, the SRFDCL appointed JLL India to monetise around 500 acres (200 ha) land which is valued ₹3,500 crore (US$370 million). As of 2023, the plots are yet to be sold.

The SRFDCL office complex was constructed at the cost of ₹48.83 crore (US$5.2 million) in 2015.

== Riverfront Phase 2 ==
In 2019 state budget, an amount of ₹850 crore (US$91 million) was provisioned for Phase 2. The Phase 2 was approved by SRFDCL in October 2020.

Under Phase 2 of the project, the riverfront will be extended towards north, up to Indira bridge, 5.8 kilometres (3.6 mi) on the east side and 5.2 kilometres (3.2 mi) on the west side. After completion, the total length of the Riverfront will be 34 kilometres (21 mi). The Ahmedabad Cantonment Board gave around 13 hectares (32 acres) land while additional 20 hectares (49 acres) land was acquired.

A 30 metres (98 ft) long barrage-cum-bridge will be constructed at the cost of ₹250 crore (US$27 million) connecting Torrent Powerhouse on the west and Sadar Bazar on the east. It will connect Sabarmati, Chandkheda, Motera to Hansol. Two additional bridges are also proposed.

Phase 2 proposes stepped promenades, parks, roads and other public amenities. It also proposes residential buildings as well as commercial buildings on the reclaimed land.

In November 2026, Gujarat Chief Minister Bhupendra Patel reviewed the progress of Phase 2 and Phase 3 during a site visit in Ahmedabad. Phase 2 covers a 5.5 km stretch between Dafnala and Indira Bridge, and Phase 3 a 5 km stretch between Indira Bridge and the Narmada Main Canal; together they will extend the riverfront to 40 km along both banks.

== Culture ==
The riverfront is featured in several Gujarati as well as Bollywood films. It hosts several annual events like Sabarmati Marathon, Sabarmati Cyclothon, flower shows, International Kite Festival and airshows. Its continuous promenade attracts runners and fitness enthusiasts. It also hosts trade shows, exhibitions and private wedding events.

== Criticism and controversy ==
The peak discharge in the Sabarmati in August 2006 was between 260,000 and 310,000 cu ft/s (8,800 m^{3}/s), which caused floods that washed away hundreds of hutments. However, Gujarat state irrigation department measured a peak flow of 550,000 cu ft/s (16,000 m^{3}/s) in 1973, before construction of Dharoi dam. So the project is criticised for lower capacity of 470,000 cu ft/s (13,000 m^{3}/s). There are also concerns regarding perennial status of the river as it depends on the Narmada canal for water. The channelisation of the river is also criticised by hydrologists and environmentalists.

The project was delayed several times due to issues regarding relocation and rehabilitation of more than 10000 slum dwellers along the river banks. After petitions by activists, the Gujarat High Court intervened and ordered halting demolition of slums until proper planning was implemented. The relocation and rehabilitation was completed later and faced criticism of activists for delays. Around 5000 families were relocated.

== Recognition and impact ==
- 1999: Prime Minister's Award for excellence in urban planning and design
- 2006: Prime Ministers Award for excellence in “Urban Design & Concept” Award - Excellence in “Urban Design and Concept”
- 2006: National Safety Council of India - Safety Award (Prashansa Patra)
- 2011: Housing and Urban Development Corporation Award (HUDCO) - Innovative Infrastructure Development
- 2012: Housing and Urban Development Corporation Award (HUDCO) - Best Practices to Improve the Living Environment
- 2014: CIDC Vishwakarma Award - Best Construction Project

Several other cities planned to follow the model for riverfront development including Vadodara, Surat, Pune, Varanasi, Chennai, Noida.

== Gallery ==
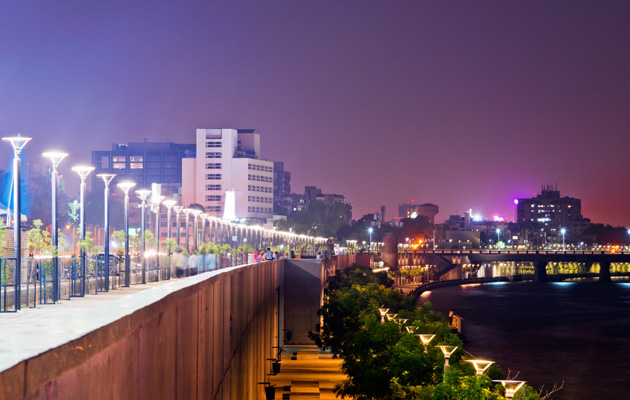

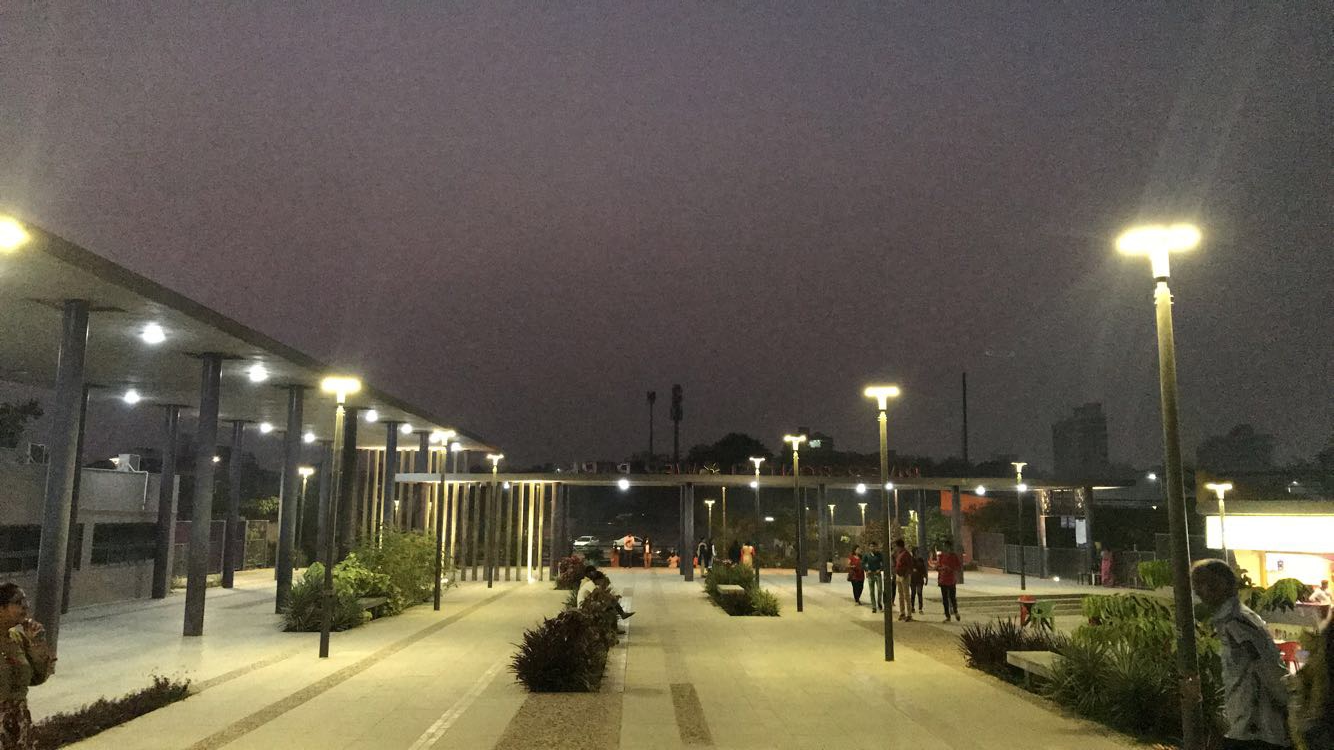

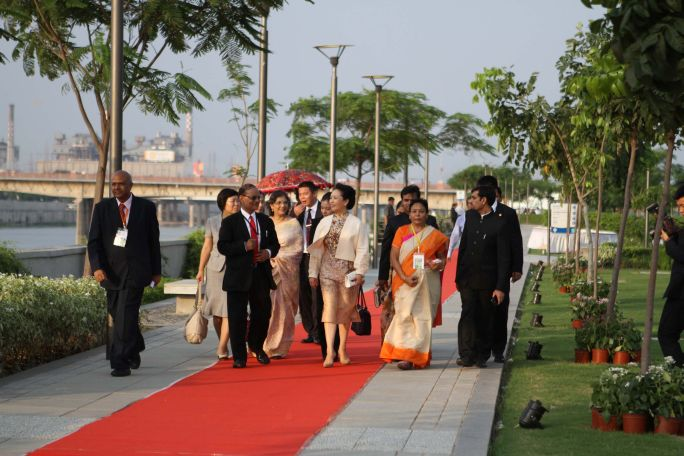

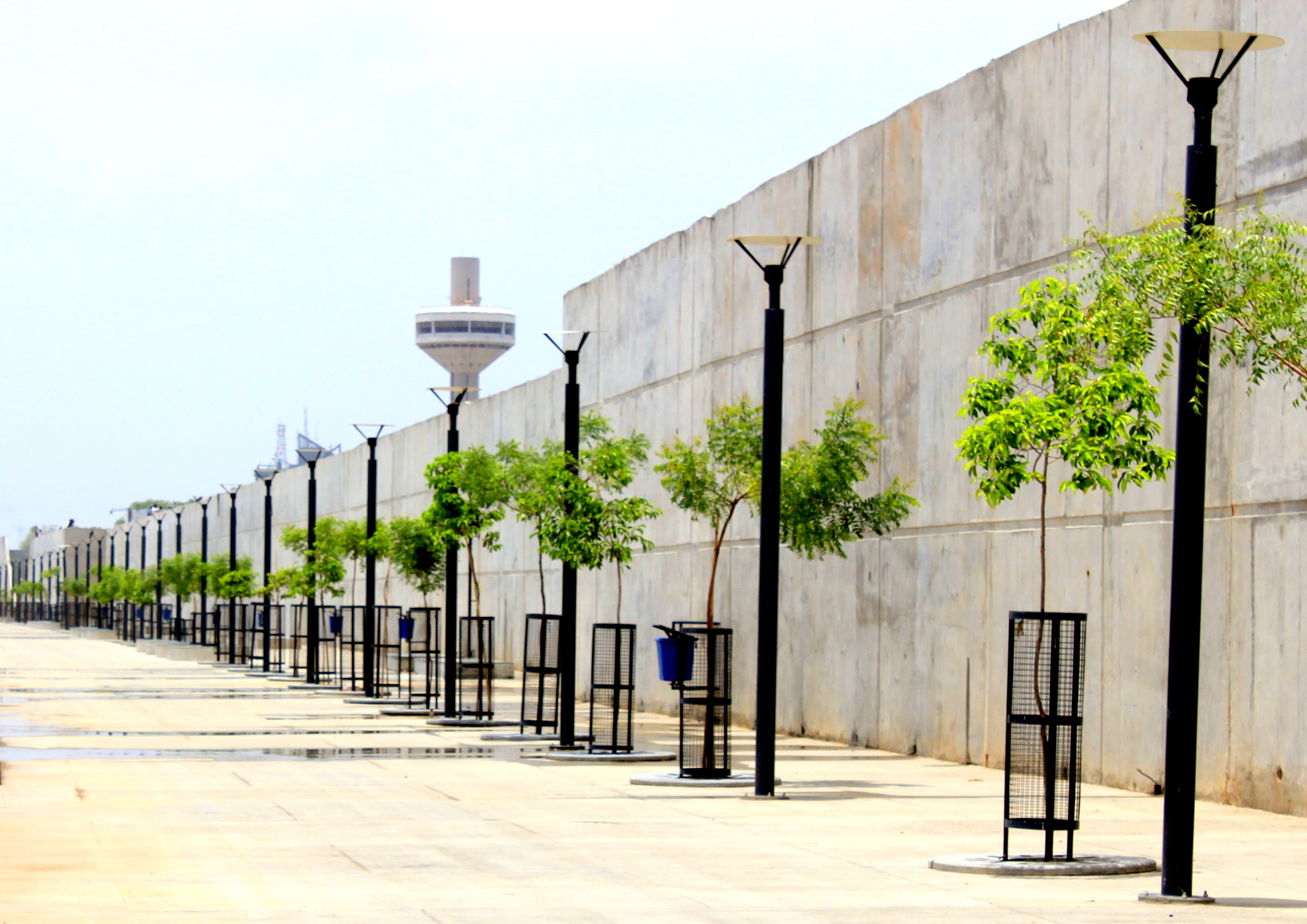

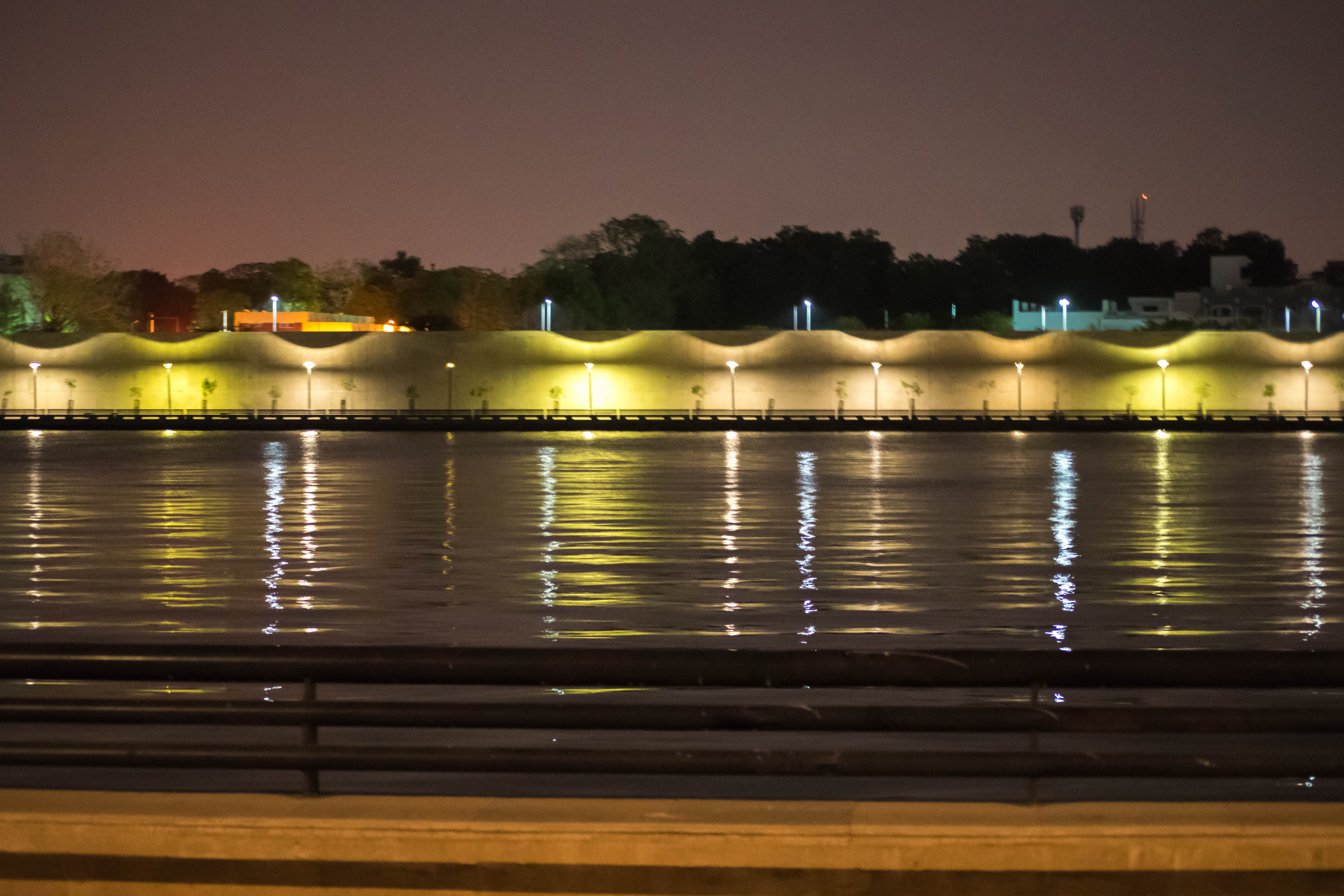

== See also ==
- Hooghly Riverfront
- Kolkata Eye
- Law Garden
