= Vasna =

Vasna may refer to the following entities in (Western) India :

- Vasna (Borsad), a town in Borsad Taluka, Anand district, Gujarat
- Vasna Barrage, a barrage dam on the Sabarmati River, Gujarat

== See also ==
- Vasana (disambiguation)
