= Subhash Bridge =

Bridge on Sabarmati river in Ahmedabad, India

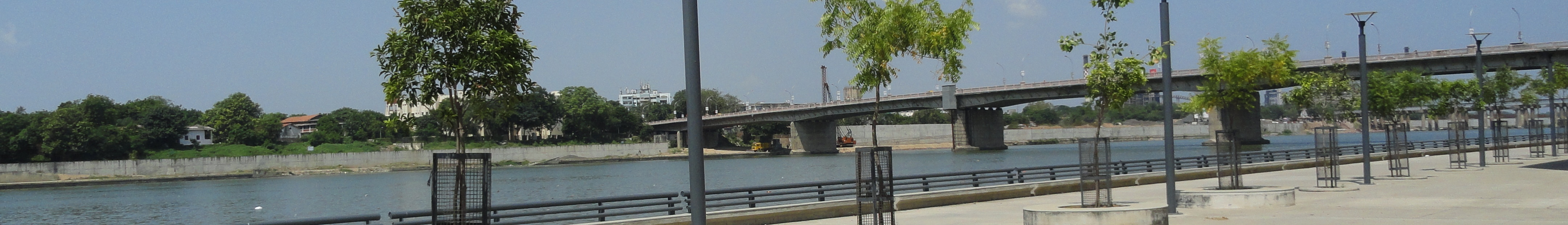
- The bridge from Sabarmati Riverfront
- Coordinates: 23.06°N 72.59°E
- Carries: vehicles, pedestrians
- Crosses: Sabarmati River
- Locale: Ahmedabad, Gujarat, India
- Named for: Subhash Chandra Bose
- Preceded by: Indira Bridge
- Followed by: Maharshi Dadhichi Bridge

Characteristics
- Design: Beam bridge
- Material: Concrete, steel
- Total length: 453.7 m (1,489 ft)
- Width: 12.8 m (42 ft)

History
- Construction end: 1973
- Closed: 4 December 2025

Location
- Interactive map of Subhash Bridge

Subhash Bridge is a beam bridge over the Sabarmati river in Ahmedabad, Gujarat, India, It was built in 1973 and demolished in 2026.

== History ==
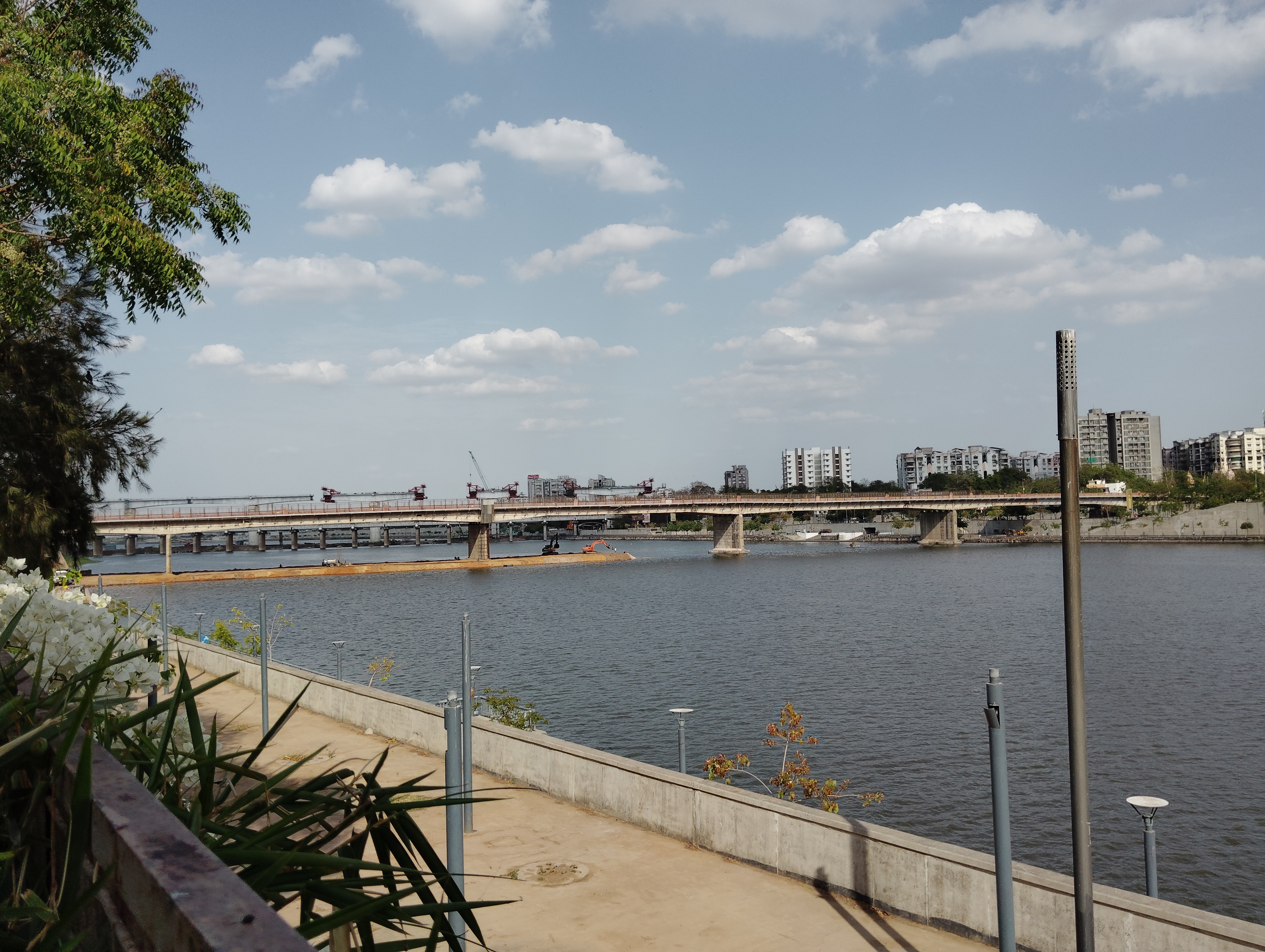
Subhash Bridge from Abhay Ghat

The bridge was built in 1973. It is 453.7 metres (1,489 ft) long and 12.8 metres (42 ft) wide.

In August 2019, Subhash bridge went under major repairs after 50 years and hence, was made to close it till eight Sundays. The bridge was closed on 4 December 2025 for inspection and repairs following a crack was observed in a span above the pillar No. 9. It was demolished in July 2026.

== Subhash Bridge Area ==
The neighborhoods near the bridge are named after the bridge itself. It is an important area in Ahmedabad for its association with Mahatma Gandhi. Gandhi Ashram is 1.5 km from Subhash Bridge. Gandhi Ashram Shopping area is a storehouse of Khadi. Subhash Bridge stands as a residential area of Ahmedabad with more than 80 residential societies spread across this place. It has been separated from rest of the city by a railway line on the west and Sabarmati river on its eastern side.

=== Locale ===
- Keshavnagar

=== Accessibility ===
- 7 km from City Railway Station.
- About 16 km from Airport.
- Ashram Road and Dr. Chinubhai Patel Road are major connecting roads here.
