= Vasana =

Vasana may refer to:

- Vasana (ship) or Bazana, a galley that was part of the Spanish Armada of 1588
- Vāsanā, a technical term in Indian philosophy

== See also ==
- Vasna (disambiguation)
