= 2021 Saurashtra flood =

Severe flood in India

- Date: September 2021
- Location: Saurashtra, Gujarat, India
- Deaths: 6

Following heavy rain in September 2021, the Saurashtra region of Gujarat state of India was affected by severe flooding. It resulted in the deaths of at least six people.

== Flood ==
Starting 12 September 2021, Jamnagar, Rajkot, Junagadh as well as districts of Saurashtra were severely affected by heavy rain in short period of time resulting in flood. Several roads were damaged and connectivity was lost for several villages. A national highway and 18 state highways were closed in these districts.

== Relief and rescue ==
The personnel from National Disaster Relief Force (NDRF), State Disaster Relief Force (SDRF), Indian Air Force and Indian Navy were deployed to carry out relief and rescue operations. Fifteen teams of NDRF were sent to Jamnagar district. Indian Navy sent six teams for assistance as well as teams from INS Valsura. More than 7000 people were evacuated and 200 more were rescued. At least six people died in flood related incidents in September 2021.

== See also ==
- 2017 Gujarat flood
- 2024 Gujarat floods
