= Ravivari Market =

Market in Ahmedabad, India

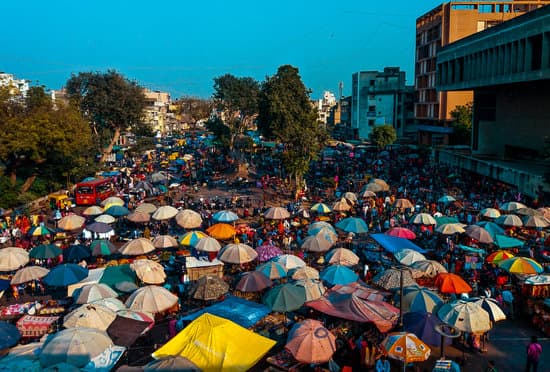

Ravivari market or Gujari Bazar is a market at the Sabarmati riverfront in Ahmedabad, India. It occurs every Sunday. Used items and antique pieces are sold there.

== Etymology ==
Ravivar is a Gujarati word which means Sunday and so the market is named as Ravivari (takes place on Sunday). It's also known as Gujari bazaar which means second-hand market.

== History ==
Ravivari Market was started by Sultan Ahmad Shah in 1414. Previously, it was known as Khaas bazar. It was operated on Friday in Bhadra Taar and in Ahmedabad. At that time, it was also known as Shukravari Bazar because it took place on Friday. Due to communal riots in 1914, the market was closed temporarily. The market soon found a new place near Siddi Saiyyed Mosque. Then, it shifted to the old civil court. Since 1954, the market has taken place at the Sabarmati riverfront. Hence, it is also known as Riverfront market. It has been made open to the public, following a formal inauguration by Gujarat Chief Minister- Narendra Modi on 3 February 2014.

In 2002, when the communal riots happened, Sabarmati River functioned as the division between two communities. The west bank of the river is known as new Ahmedabad, where upper-middle-class people live; while the east bank of the river is old Ahmedabad, where lower-income people and minority class people live. The whole market is placed in the open space at Sabarmati Riverfront at Ellisbridge. The market does not have any formal physical entrance gate. However, there has an unwritten agreement among the vendors of where the market begins and ends. The entire market spreads across 32,000 square feet behind Gaikwad Haveli, Ellisbridge, and Sardar Bridge.

== Occupancy ==
The market has a platform for 1641 vendors. There are 1200 vendors registered in Gujari Association, among which one third are the women. There are many other vendors who trade along with Gujari traders but have not registered in Gujari Association. Most of the vendors sell used items but some vendors sell new items. The fees per stall per Sunday are ₨.6 for non-members and Rs. 3 for members of Gujari Association members. Ahmed Shah Guajri Association looks after all the Gujari traders and also pays Rs. 302 as a rent for the land every Sunday. There are other 7000 to 10,000 traders, who get indirect business through the market. It is estimated that over 3000 visitors visit every Sunday. SRFDCL – Sabarmati Riverfront Development Corporate Limited has allotted 16,500 spaces for parking vehicles. Minimum 280 two wheelers and 425 four wheelers can be parked on either sides of the market.

== Market overview ==
Multiple products are available here at Ravivari market. The basic available products include all kinds of kitchen supplies, tools, furniture, hardware, clothing, electronics, used books, bedding, antiques, goats and chickens and any other household goods. An entire area is allotted to sell rat traps in various shapes, sizes in metal or wood. Products like aluminium utensils and plastic wares are available at Rs. 10 per piece.

== Issues ==
During the Sabarmati Riverfront Development Project in 2010, Ravivari market was going to close permanently. The market was an obstacle for making 7,000 houses in a shanty town on the river bank was demolished. Around 20,000 displaced people were going to resettle close to the city. However, later on it was decided give a 32,000 square meter plot for the Ravivari market.

In November 2011, around 2000 vendors in Ravivari market suffered from loss because AMC (Ahmedabad Municipal Corporation) had occupied their space. Vendors were told that the market was closed as the anti-encroachment drive was in progress. A public interest litigation (PIL) was filed in the High Court seeking a relief for vendors in Gujari. A division bench of the High Court, comprising Chief Justice S J Mukhopadhaya and Justice J B Pardiwala, directed AMC not to take any action against the vendors. The high Court granted a stay on eviction of 1,200 vendors in Gujari bazar.
