= Vasna Barrage =

- Vasna Barrage
- Interactive map of Vasna Barrage
- Country: India
- Location: Ahmedabad, Ahmedabad district, Gujarat
- Coordinates: 22.99042331°N 72.55566373°E
- Purpose: Irrigation
- Status: Operational
- Construction began: 1972
- Opening date: 1976
- Construction cost: est. ₹887.48 lakh (US$930,000)
- Owner: Government of Gujarat

Dam and spillways
- Type of dam: Barrage
- Impounds: Sabarmati River
- Height (foundation): 20.75 metres (68 ft)
- Length: 611 metres (2,000 ft)
- Spillways: 24 vertical
- Spillway type: Broad crest
- Spillway capacity: 21000 m3/s

Reservoir
- Catchment area: 10,619 square kilometres (1.1×10^{11} sq ft)
- Surface area: 107 square kilometres (1.2×10^{9} sq ft)
- Website; Vasna Barrage

Vasna Barrage is a barrage on the Sabarmati River in Ahmedabad, Gujarat, India. Constructed in 1976, the barrage is meant for strengthening the existing irrigation system.

== Features ==
The barrage holds the water in the part of river in Ahmedabad throughout the year and supplies drinking water to the city. It also feeds underground water aquifers in the region. The bedrock is of river deposits. Total 87 villages of Ahmedabad district fall under its command area. The right bank irrigation canal called Fatehwadi canal is 6.9 km long and was completed in 1978. It has discharge capacity of 45.35 cubic metre per second. The canal supplies water only when the river overflows.

== See also ==
- Sabarmati Riverfront
- Dharoi dam
