= Vasant Parikh =

Indian politician

Vasant Vrajlal Parikh (14 February 1929 ― 16 March 2007) was an Indian politician, social worker, writer, eye surgeon and Ayurveda doctor from Gujarat.

== Biography ==
Parikh was born on 14 February 1929 at Vadnagar (now in Mehsana district, Gujarat, India) in a Hindu Vaishnav family. He became orphan when he was one and half years old. He was raised by his uncle and aunt, first in Bombay and then in Vadnagar. He studied Ayurveda at Jamnagar Ayurveda College and served as a doctor in government hospital for brief period. He studied in Bombay and became an eye surgeon. With Dr. Dwarkadas Joshi, he founded the Nagrik Mandal Hospital in Vadnagar where he served for rest of his life. He started a TB Hospital in memory of his sister.

He was a member of Gujarat Legislative Assembly from 1967 to 1971, being elected from Kheralu constituency as an independent candidate defeating Shankerji Okhaji Thakore of Indian National Congress. He had won the election with lowest minimum expenses of ₹6,000 (equivalent to ₹320,000 or US$3,800 in 2023). He is considered to be one of former state chief minister and prime minister Narendra Modi's political gurus. He is credited with coining the term 'One vote, One note' meaning give me a vote as well as one rupee donation for election campaign as he had no money to contest the election. He was chief supporter of Dharoi dam and was instrumental in campaign for it. He did 9-day walk from Vadnagar to Gandhinagar for the dam which was finally approved in 1971. He was defeated in 1972 and 1995 legislative assembly elections.

He established Karuna Setu trust along with his wife Ratnaprabha Maniar in 1984. He had written 42 books. He died on 16 March 2007 in Vadnagar.

Vasant-Prabha Hospital in Vadnagar is named after him.
