= Bazana =

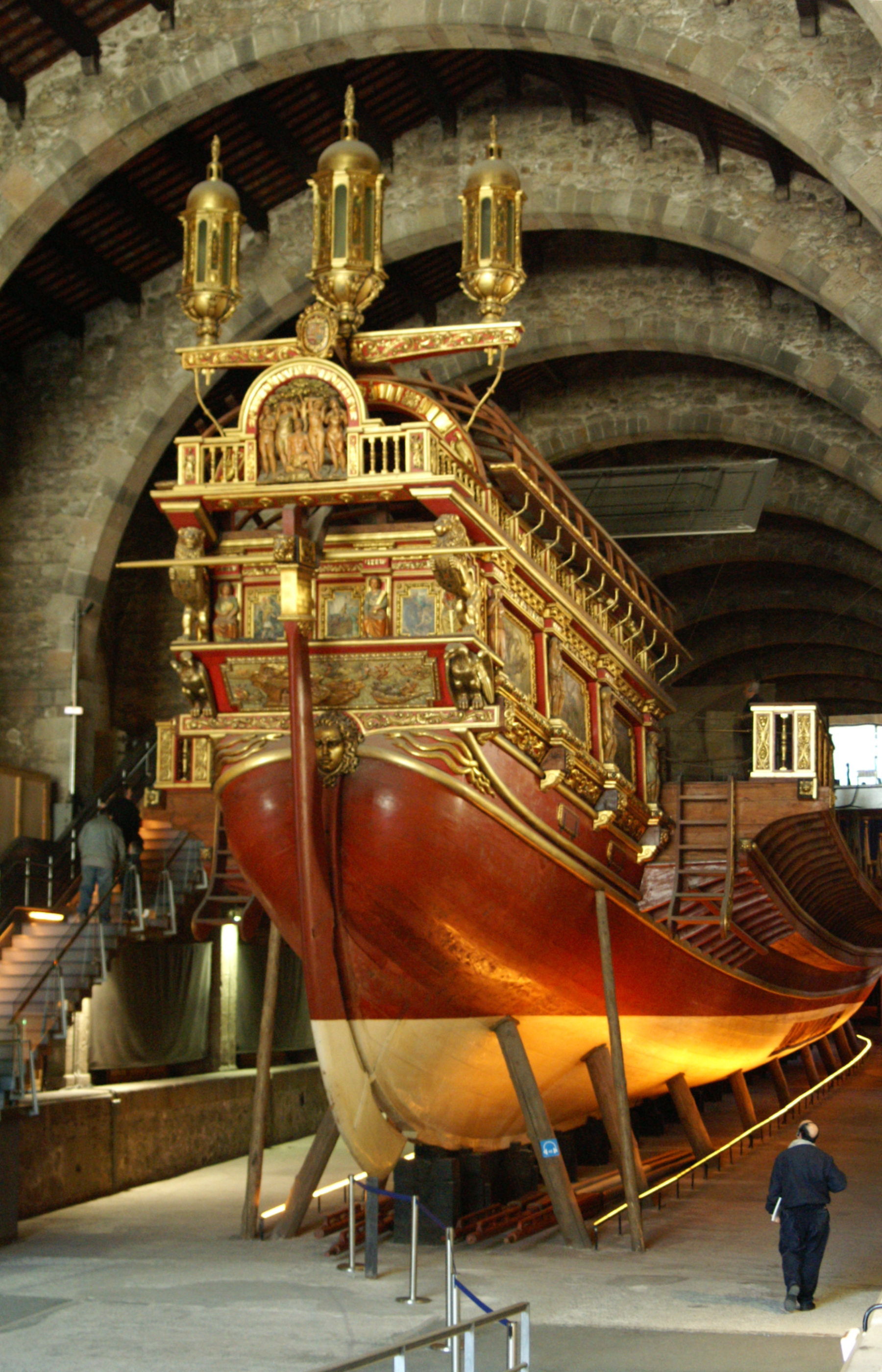
Replica of La Real in Barcelona, the Spanish Galley flagship in Lepanto battle.

The Bazana (often called Vasana in older English sources) was a galley which was a part of the Spanish Armada of 1588. It played a minor and relatively unremarkable part in the campaign: whilst passing through the Bay of Biscay the fleet was hit by a tempest, forcing the four lightly built ships of the galley squadron to take shelter in French ports. One galley, the Diana, ran aground in the harbour entrance at Bayonne, but the crew, including the galley slaves who rowed the ship, were rescued; the Bazana and the other two ships took around ten days to repair their storm damage, and subsequently returned to Spain.

The Bazana owes its fame to a highly fictitionalized account of its fate associated with David Gwynne, a Welsh prisoner who was forced to serve in the Armada as a galley slave. According to this version, the Diana sank with the loss of all hands when the squadron were still far from port, and the captain of the Bazana appealed to Gwynne's skill as a seaman in the hope that he could save the ship; Gwynne exploited the situation to get the slaves freed from their shackles, enabling them to kill the Spanish crew and seize the ship using homemade stilettos. Next, this version claims, another galley, the Royal (i.e. the Capitana or flagship), attempted to attack them, but Gwynne and the other freed slaves boarded the larger ship, massacred the second Spanish crew and sailed both ships to Bayonne. Gwynne's story was popularized as a propaganda in the Dutch Revolt, and came to be treated as fact by many English historians of the nineteenth century, inspiring Theodore Watts-Dunton in, The Jubilee Greeting at Spithead to the Men of Greater Britain.

The reality was exposed in the 1880s by the Spanish naval historian Capitan de Navio Cesáreo Fernández Duro, who argued that Gwynn was even aboard the Diana rather than the Bazana: he and some other English galley slaves simply absconded, or were allowed to depart, after the squadron reached harbour in France. Duro's findings were communicated to the English audience by Prof. Sir John Knox Laughton in 1894. Most detailed modern histories of the Armada campaign make a point of refuting the fictions.

A galley named Bazana subsequently participated in the Spanish victory in the Battle of Cornwall in 1595.

== Bibliography ==
- Beeton, Samuel Orchart Beetons Boys Annual of Fact, Fiction, History and Adventure Ward Lock & Tyler. 1870.
- Duro, Cesáreo Fernández La Armada Invencible. Impresores de la Real Casa. 1884-5
- Hake, Thomas The Life And Letters Of Theodore Watts-Dunton Kessinger. 11 January 2005. ISBN 978-1-4179-6143-6
- Hart-Davis, Duff, Armada Bantam. 1988.
- Howarth, David The Voyage of the Armada: The Spanish Story Viking Press. 1981
- Laughton, Sir John Knox State Papers relating to the Defeat of the Spanish Armada, Anno 1558 Navy Records Society. 1894.
- Martínez, Ricardo Cerezo Las Armadas de Felipe II: Historia de la Marina Española Editorial San Martin. 1988.
- Mattingly, Garrett The Armada Mariner Books. 2005.
- Shippen, Edward Naval battles ancient and modern J. C. McCurdy & Co. 1883.
