= Dharoi dam =

Dharoi Dam
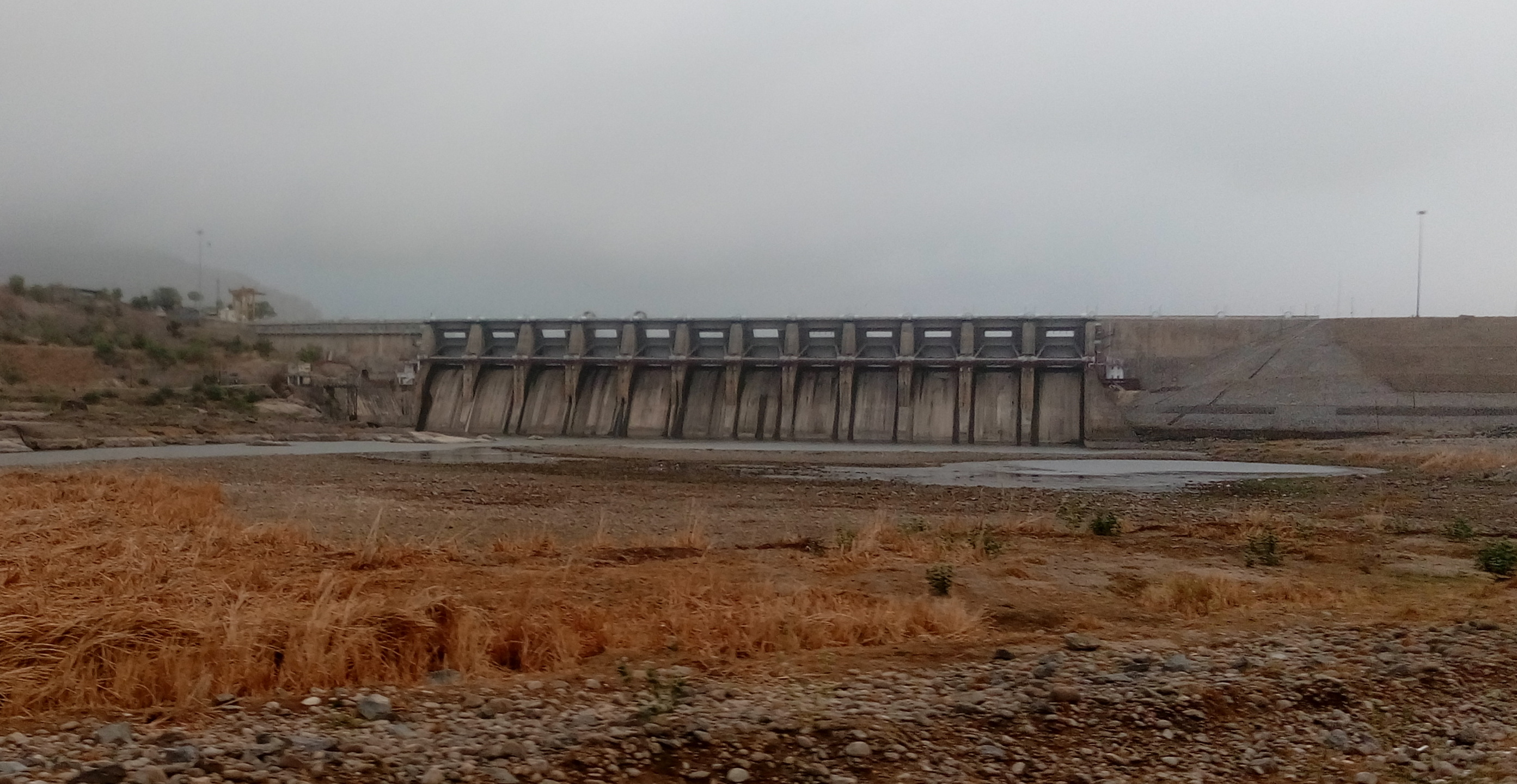
- Dharoi dam before monsoon

- Dharoi Dam
- Interactive map of Dharoi Dam
- Official name: Dharoi dam
- Country: India
- Location: Mehsana and Sabarkantha districts
- Coordinates: 24°0′16″N 72°51′13″E
- Purpose: Irrigation and water supply
- Status: Operational
- Construction began: 1971
- Opening date: 1978
- Construction cost: ₹96 crore (equivalent to ₹46 billion or US$480 million in 2023)

Dam and spillways
- Impounds: Sabarmati River
- Height (foundation): 45.87 metres (150 ft)
- Length: 1,207 metres (4,000 ft)
- Spillways: 12 radial
- Spillway type: Ogee
- Spillway capacity: 21662 m3/s

Reservoir
- Total capacity: 908.6 MCM
- Catchment area: 5,475 square kilometres (5.9×10^{10} sq ft)
- Surface area: 107 square kilometres (1.2×10^{9} sq ft)

Power Station
- Type: Conventional
- Hydraulic head: 31.7 metres (100 ft)
- Installed capacity: 1.4 MW
- Website; Dharoi Dam

Dharoi Dam is a gravity dam on the Sabarmati River near Dharoi, Satlasana Taluka, and Mehsana districts of northern Gujarat in India. Completed in 1978, the dam is meant for irrigation, power generation and flood control.

== History ==
Politician Vasant Parikh was the chief supporter of Dharoi dam and was instrumental in campaign for it. He did 9-day walk from Vadnagar to Gandhinagar for the dam. He met then Prime Minister Indira Gandhi in Bombay (now Mumbai) and New Delhi. The dam was approved and the foundation stone laid by Indira Gandhi in 1971.

== Features ==
Video of Dharoi dam

Total 19 villages partially and 28 villages fully submerged into the dam reservoir so they were relocated to new villages. Total land submerged under reservoir include 349.39 hectares (863.4 acres; 1.3490 sq mi) forest land, 2,727.55 hectares (6,739.9 acres; 10.5311 sq mi) wasteland, 7,489.87 hectares (18,507.9 acres; 28.9185 sq mi) cultivable land.

Its left bank canal is 29.5 km long while right bank canal is 43.5 km long. They were completed in 1984.

It irrigated 31,393 hectares (77,570 acres; 121.21 sq mi) in 2007–08. The planned command area was 61,085 hectares (150,940 acres; 235.85 sq mi).

== Tourism ==
The Gujarat government announced a three-phase development project to create a tourism hub in the Dharoi Dam area. The INR 1100 crore budget project includes development of an adventure water sports arena, an amphitheater, and themed parks. The master plan and design of the project is made by a Ahmedabad based INI Design Studio.
