= Sabarmati River =

River in Rajasthan and Gujarat, India

Coordinates: 22°18′N 72°22′E

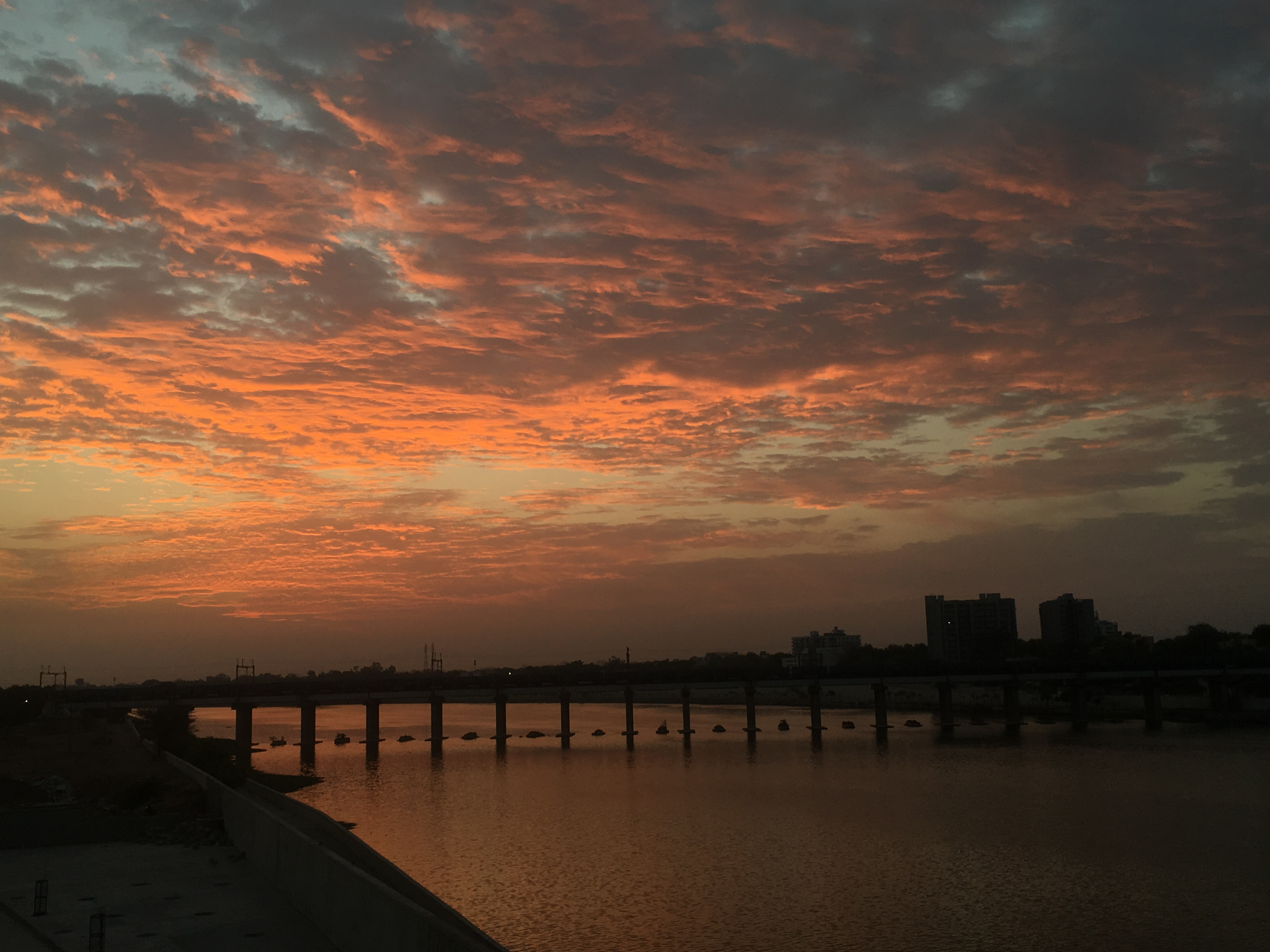
- Sabarmati River near Ahmedabad, Gujarat

Location
- Country: India
- State: Gujarat, Rajasthan
- Cities: Ahmedabad, Gandhinagar

Physical characteristics
- Source
  - location: Aravalli Range, Udaipur District, Rajasthan, India
  - elevation: 782 m (2,566 ft)
- Mouth
  - location: Gulf of Khambhat, Gujarat, India
- Length: 371 km (231 mi)
- Basin size: 30,680 km^{2} (11,850 sq mi)
- Discharge
  - average: 120 m^{3}/s (4,200 cu ft/s)
- Discharge
  - location: Ahmedabad
  - average: 33 m^{3}/s (1,200 cu ft/s)
  - minimum: 0 m^{3}/s (0 cu ft/s)
  - maximum: 484 m^{3}/s (17,100 cu ft/s)

Basin features
- Tributaries
  - left: Wakal River, Harnav River, Hathmati River, Watrak River
  - right: Sei River

The Sabarmati River (Gujarati: [sabəɾmət̪iː]) is one of the major west-flowing rivers in India. It originates in the Aravalli Range in the Udaipur District of Rajasthan and meets the Gulf of Khambhat in the Arabian Sea after travelling 371 km (231 mi) in a south-westerly direction across Rajasthan, and Gujarat. 48 km (30 mi) of the river length is in Rajasthan, while 323 km (201 mi) is in Gujarat.

== Course ==
The Sabarmati River originates in the Aravalli Range of the Indian state of Rajasthan. The river has a total length of 371 km (231 mi). After flowing for 48 km (30 mi) in Rajasthan it enters the state of Gujarat where it is joined by its left-bank tributary, Wakal, near the village Ghonpankhari. The river then continues southwest towards Mhauri, where it is joined by the right-bank tributary the Sei River. Before entering the Dharoi Reservoir, the river is joined by the left-bank tributary Harnav River. After the Sabarmati passes the Dharoi dam it meets another left bank tributary, the Hathmati River.. The river then flows past Ahmedabad, where it is joined by the left-bank tributary the Vatrak River. The Sabarmati eventually flows into the Gulf of Khambhat, in the Arabian Sea.

== Basin ==
The catchment area of the Sabarmati basin is 21,674 km^{2} (8,368 sq mi) out of which 4,124 km^{2} (1,592 sq mi) lies in Rajasthan State and the remaining 18,550 km^{2} (7,160 sq mi) in Gujarat. The basin is located in a semi-arid zone with rainfall ranging from 450 to 800 mm (18 to 31 in) in different parts of the basin. The river traverses three geomorphic zones: rocky uplands, middle alluvial plains, and lower estuarine zone.

The major tributaries are the Watrak, Wakal, Hathmati, Harnav, and Sei rivers. Average annual water availability in the Sabarmati basin is 308 m^{3} (10,900 cu ft) per capita, which is significantly lower than the national average of 1,545 m^{3} (54,600 cu ft) per capita.

The Sabarmati is a seasonal river whose flows are dominated by the monsoon, with little or no flows post-monsoon. An average flow of 33 m^{3} (1,170 cu ft) per second was measured at Ahmedabad during the period 1968–1979. Over the past century, the flood of August 1973 is considered to be the largest flood, when a flow of 14,150 m^{3} (499,700 cu ft) per second was measured at Dharoi.

== Significance in Hinduism ==
In Rajasthan, it is believed that the Sabarmati River originated due to the penance of ascetic Kashyapa on Mount Abu. His penance had pleased Shiva and in return, Shiva gave ascetic Kashyapa the Ganges River. The Ganges River flowed from Shiva's hair onto Mount Abu and became the Sabarmati River. In another legend surrounding the origin of the river, Shiva brought the goddess Ganga to Gujarat and that caused the Sabarmati to come into being.

== History ==
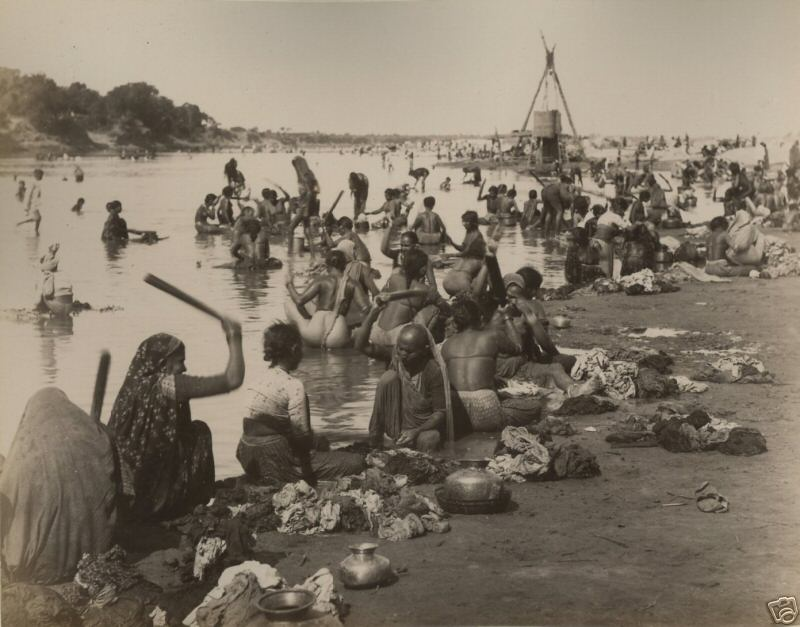
Women washing clothes at the Sabarmati river, Ahmedabad (late 19th or early 20th century)

Rajashekhara's Kavya-mimamsa (10th century) calls the river Shvabhravati (IAST: Śvabhravatī). The 11th century text Shringara-manjari-katha calls it "Sambhramavati" (literally, "full of fickleness").

Jain acharya Buddhisagarsuri has written many poems about the Sabarmati River.

During India's independence struggle, Mahatma Gandhi established the Sabarmati Ashram as his home on the banks of this river.

In 2018, an assessment by the Central Pollution Control Board (CPCB) named the Kheroj-Vautha stretch of the Sabarmati among the most polluted river stretches in India. Ahmedabad civic body's failure to build a sewage treatment plant in Motera resulted in further pollution of the river water.

The Narendra Modi Stadium and future Sardar Vallabhbhai Patel Sports Enclave are situated near the river.

=== Sabarmati Riverfront ===
The Sabarmati Riverfront project is a project undertaken by the government aimed to enrich the economy. As per the research conducted by couple of academics, the main concern of the riverfront project was to reduce river pollution, increase tourism, and prevent future floods. As of 2020, the second phase of the project has received in-principle approval. KPMG has listed the Sabarmati Riverfront project in its top 100 most innovative global infrastructure projects.

== Dams ==
There are several reservoirs on the Sabarmati and its tributaries. The Dharoi dam is located on the main river. The Hathmati, Harnav and Guhai dams are located on the tributaries meeting the main river upstream of Ahmedabad while Meshvo reservoir, Meshvo pick-ueir, Mazam and Watrak dams are located on tributaries meeting downstream. The Kalpasar is planned project in the Gulf of Khambhat.

In 2002, water from the Narmada river was released into the Sabarmati River through the Sardar Sarovar dam.

== Gallery ==
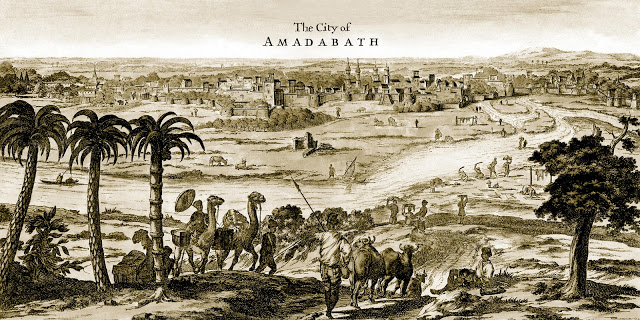
Lithograph by Dutchman Philip Baldeus depicting Ahmedabad and Sabarmati River circa 1752

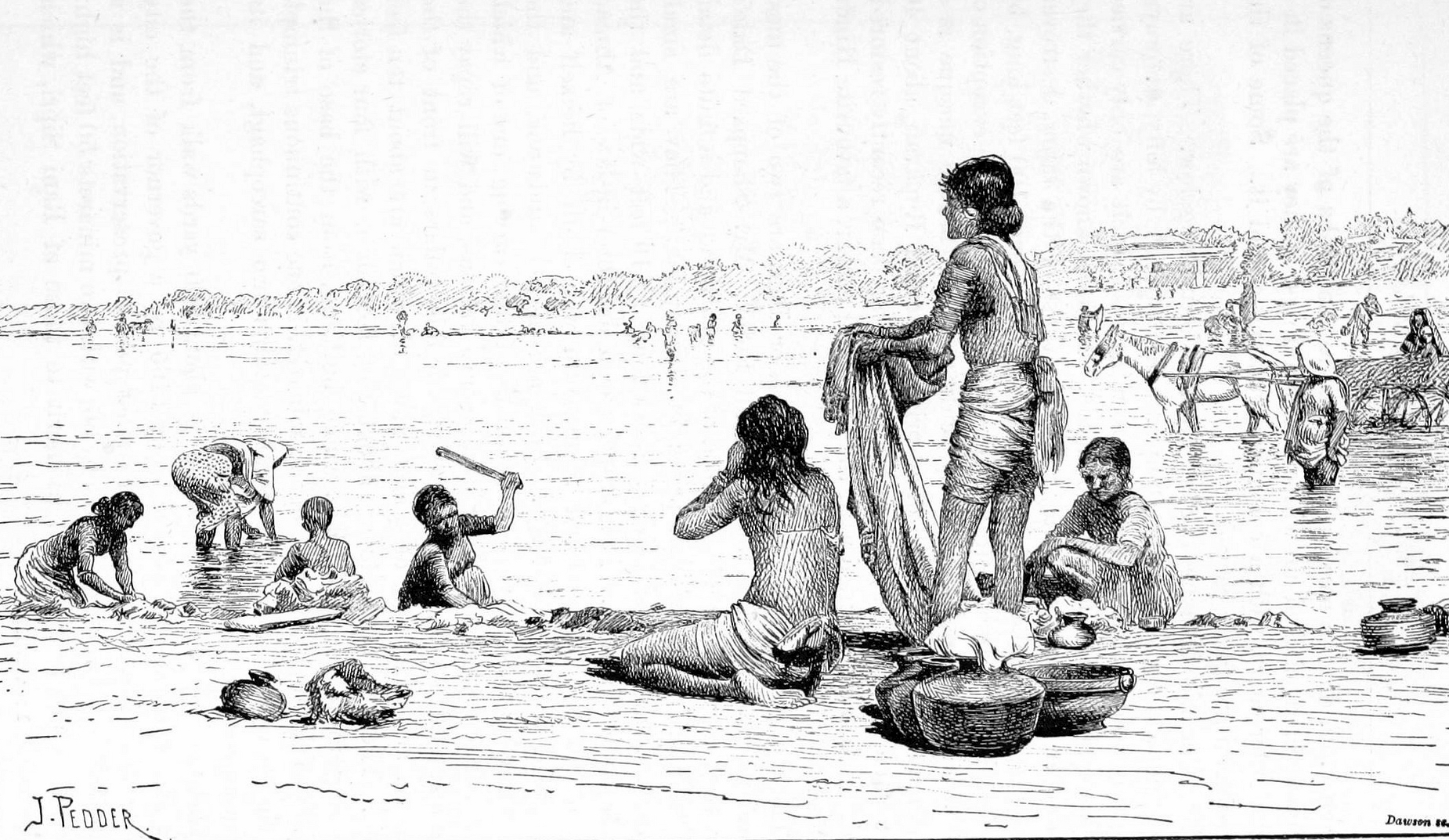
Sabarmati River in 1890

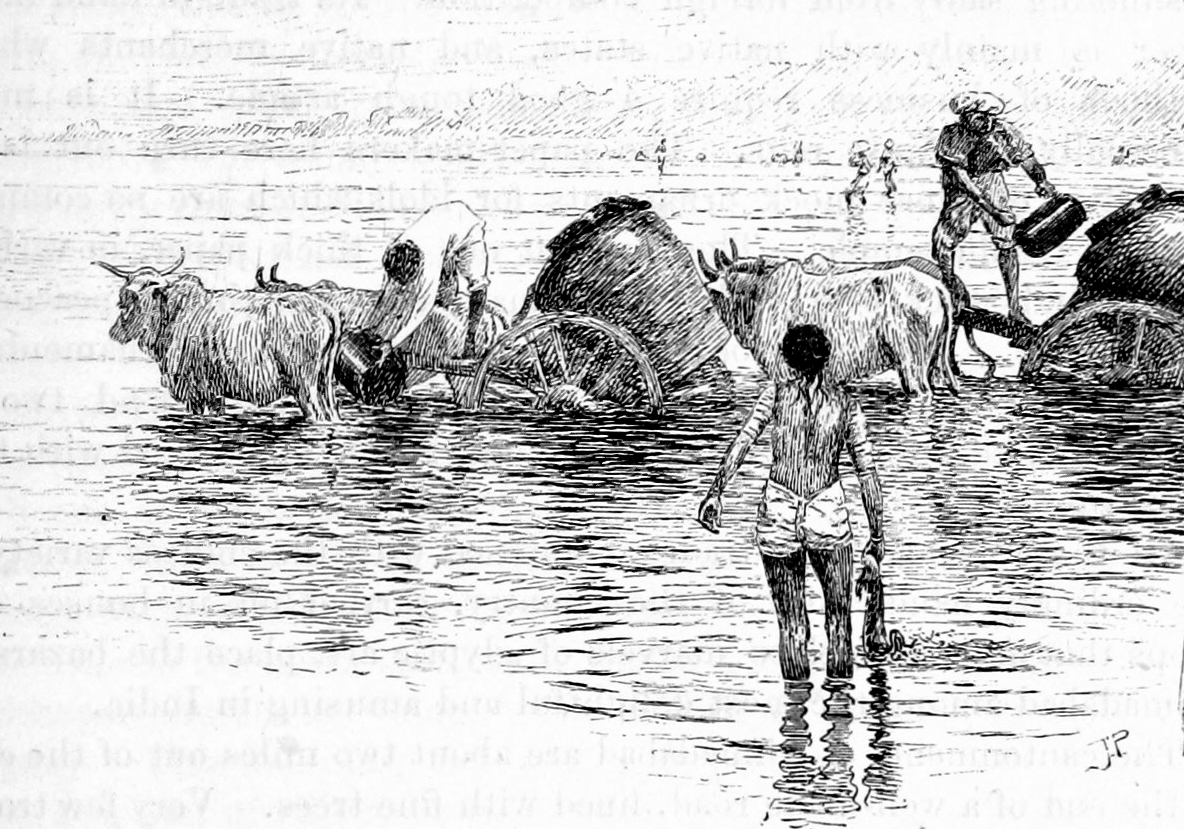
Watercarts in Sabarmati near Ahmedabad in 1890s

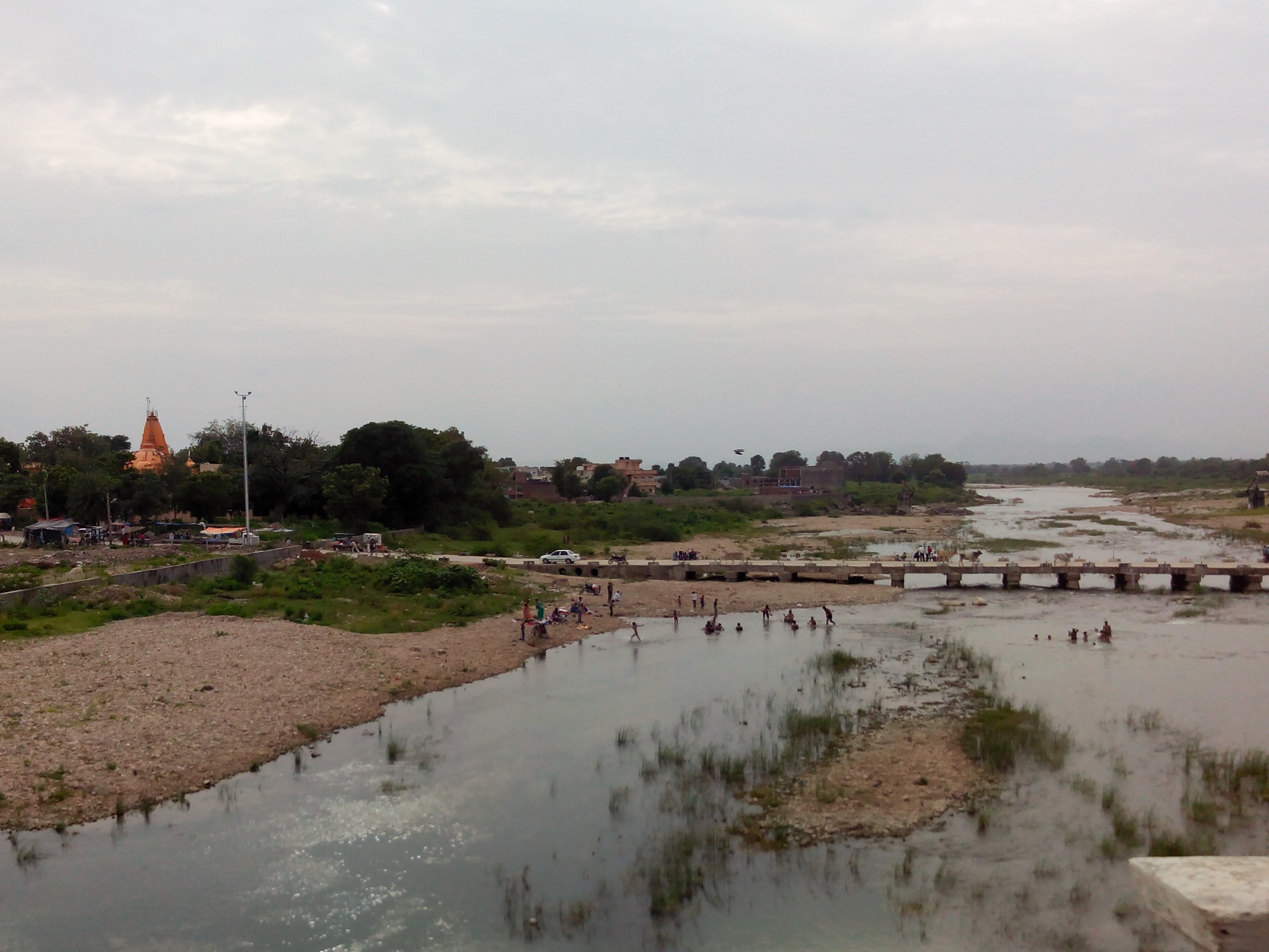
View of the Harnav, a tributary of the Sabarmati

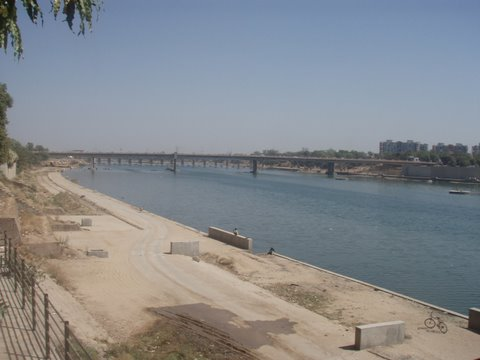
Construction work going on near the river under the Sabarmati River Front Development Project

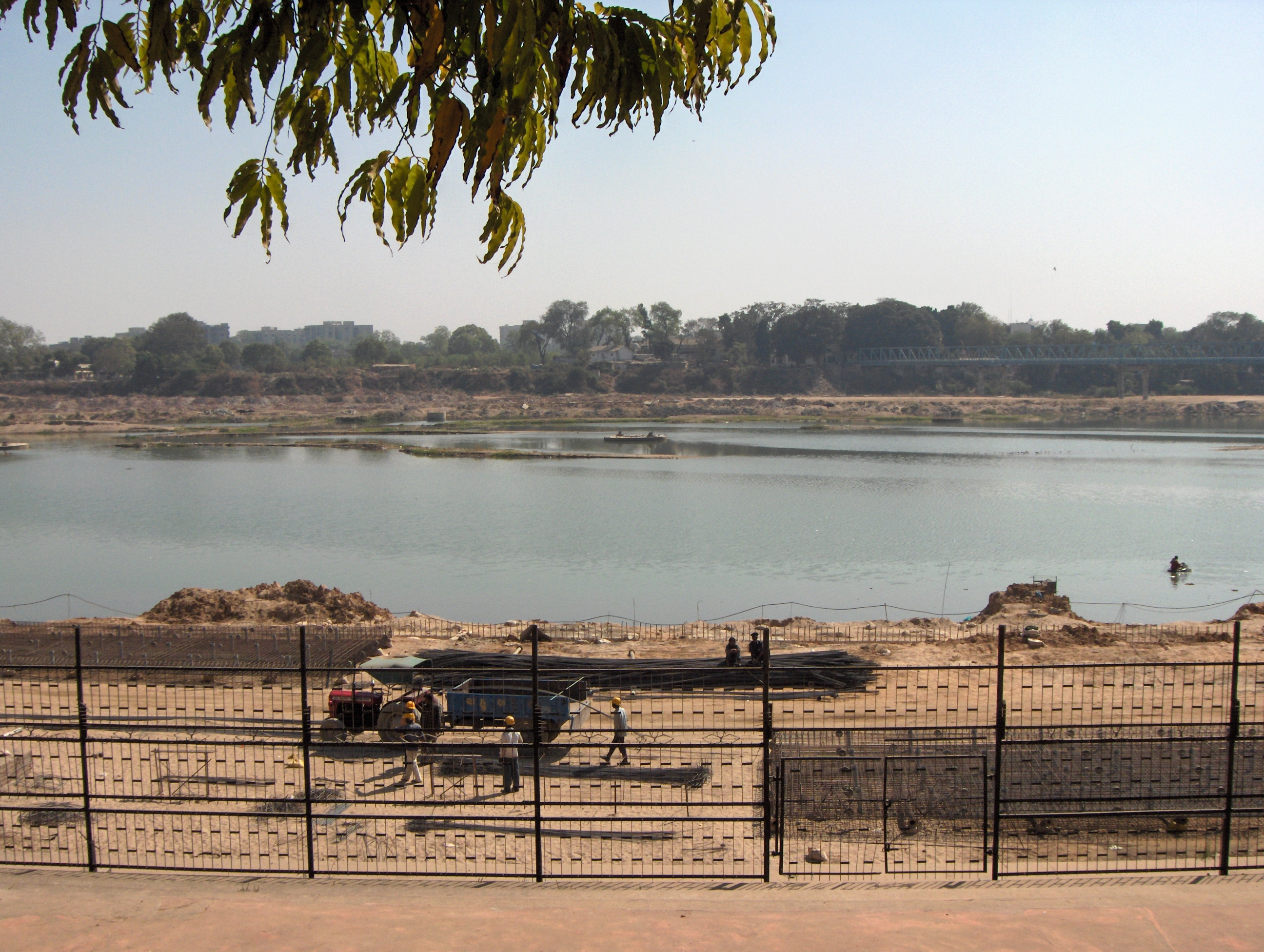
River Sabarmati in Ahmedabad, Gujarat

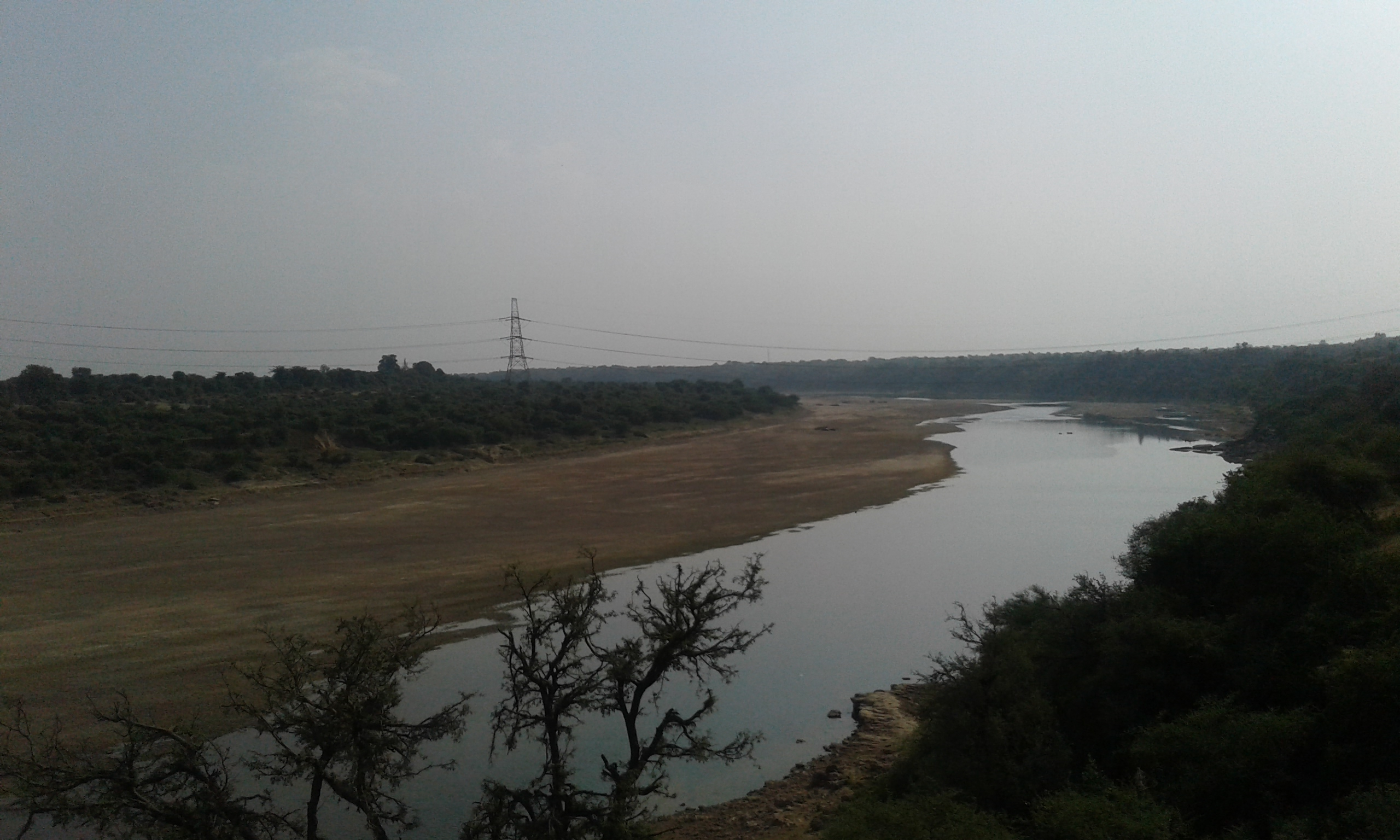
Sabarmati River near Ambod

== See also ==
- Ahmedabad
- Sabarmati River Front
- List of most-polluted rivers
- List of rivers in India
- Sabarmati Ashram
