= Premabhai Hall =

Coordinates: 23°01′26″N 72°34′56″E

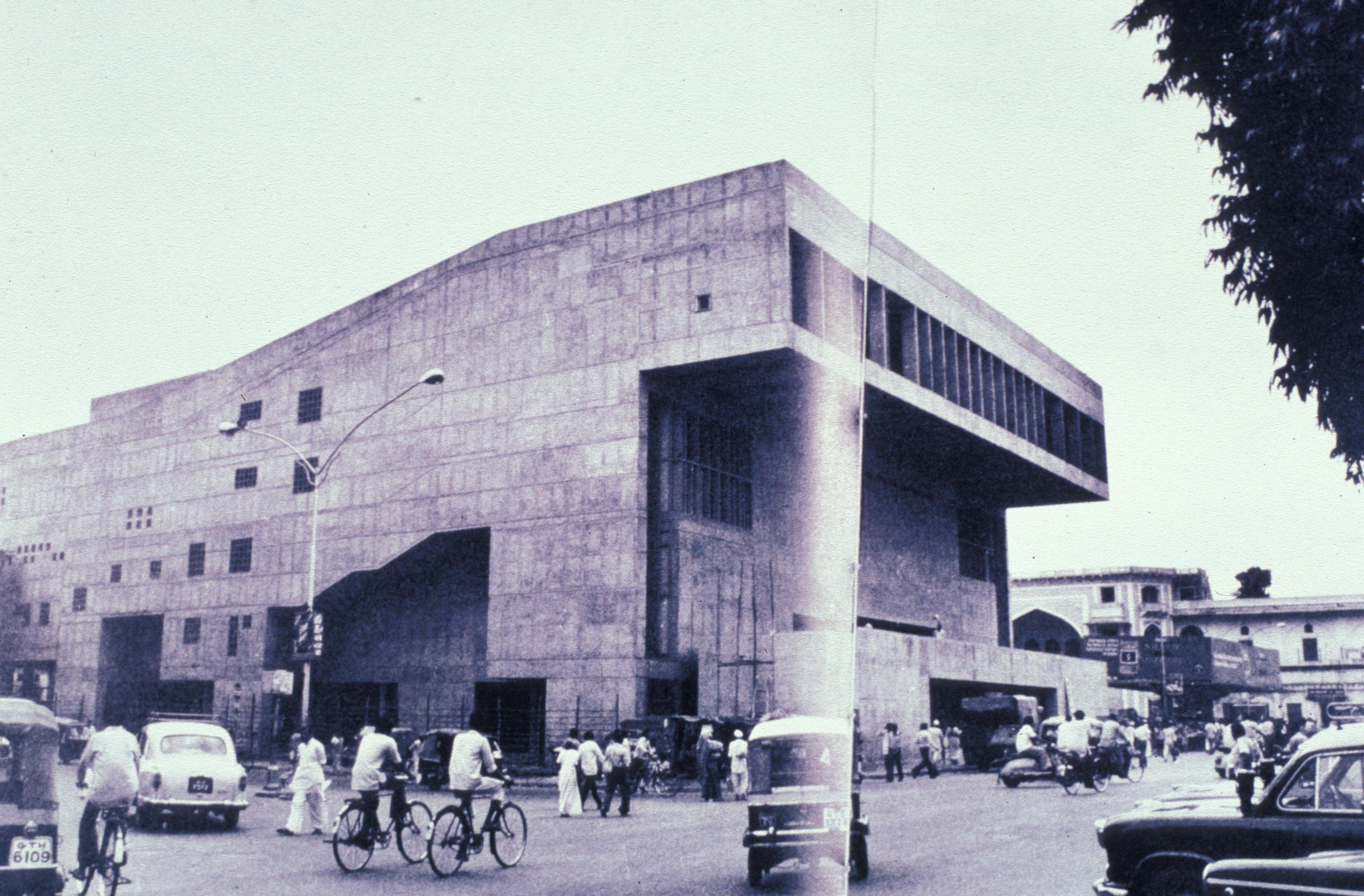
- Interactive map of the Premabhai Hall area

General information
- Architectural style: Brutalism
- Location: Ahmedabad
- Completed: 1972
- Owner: Gujarat Vidhya Sabha

Design and construction
- Architect: B. V. Doshi
- Structural engineer: Mahendra Raj

Other information
- Seating capacity: 1,000

Premabhai Hall is an abandoned public theater in the old city of Ahmedabad, India designed by architect B. V. Doshi. It was opened in 1972 and abandoned in 1997. It is an example of Brutalist architecture.

== History ==
The land for this hall was donated by Nagarsheth Premabhai Zaveri, after whom the hall was named Premabhai Hall., Premabhai hall was originally founded in the year 1930 as first ever town hall of Ahmedabad.

During the British period, the hall was used for theatrical performances located in the old city. In 1956, the new building of the hall was designed by architect B. V. Doshi. In 1972, the new building built in a brutalist style was opened. It is owned by the Gujarat Vidya Sabha.

In the 1997, the hall was abandoned due to fire regulation problems and financial issues. After a failed demolition proposal, the building remains standing, although abandoned.

== Architecture ==
The hall is built in post-Le Corbusier brutalist style, with the entire structure built out of reinforced concrete. It houses an auditorium with a seating capacity of 1000. The stage is 100 metres (330 ft) wide. It has spacious interior corridors and large public gathering spaces. The roof has large terrace. The large structure looks like a monumental sculpture.

== See also ==
- Ahmedabad Town Hall
- Tagore Memorial Hall
- Vijali Ghar
