= Ashram Road =

Major thoroughfare in Ahmedabad, India

Coordinates: 23°02′10″N 72°34′08″E

The Ashram Road is one of the major roads in the city of Ahmedabad in India. The road was constructed in 1976, with a major portion of it running parallel to the Sabarmati. The road is a major financial hub of the city with the offices of the Reserve Bank of India and the Income Tax department located on the road. The road is also a tourist destination with the Sabarmati Ashram and the City Gold multiplex located on the road. Several of the best showrooms for sarees and traditional clothing like Asopalav and Anupam are situated on this road.

Important offices and landmarks located on Ashram road are:

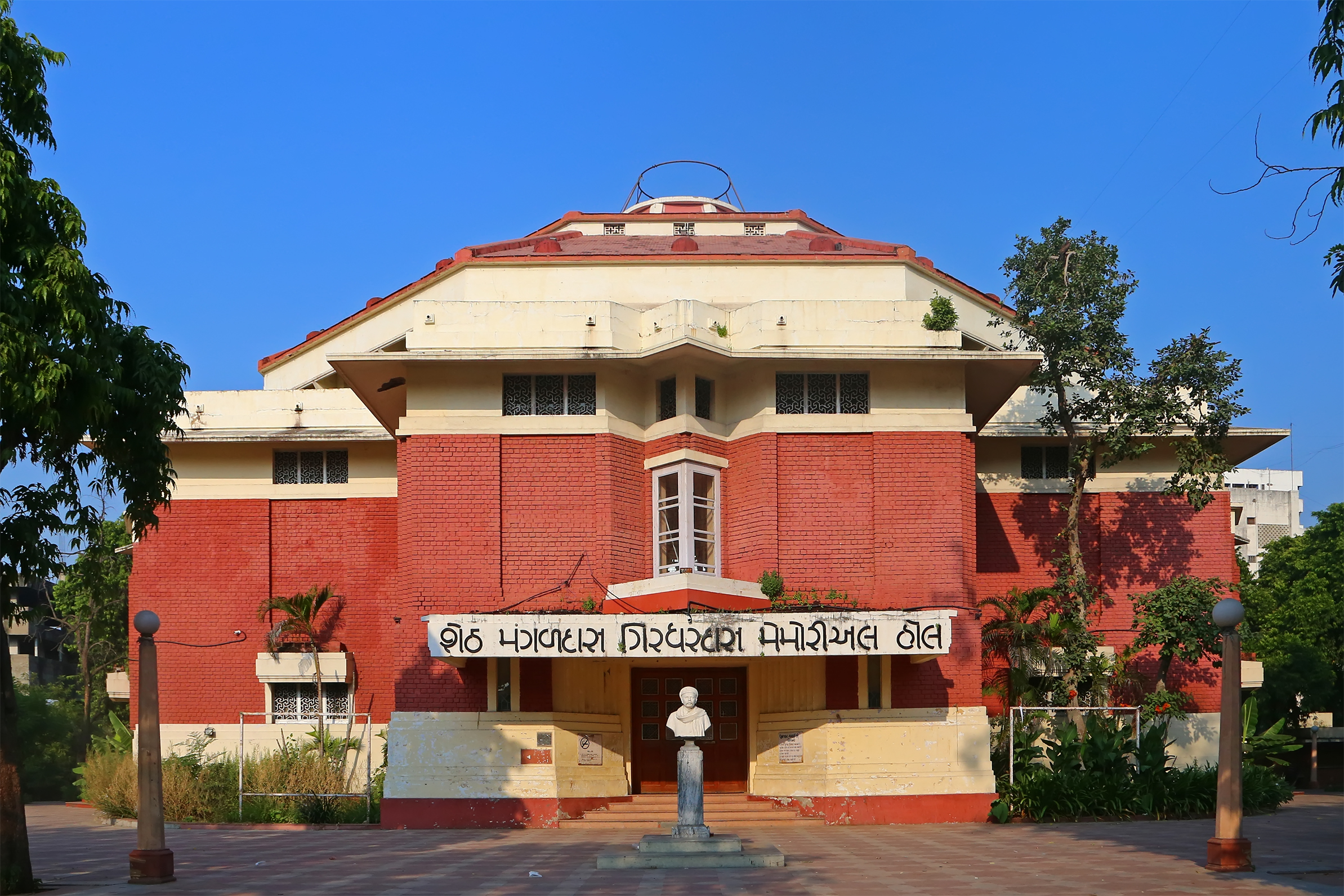
The town hall located on Ashram Road

- Reserve Bank of India Office
- Income Tax Office Buildings
- Times of India Office Building
- Sabarmati Ashram
- Gujarat Vidyapith
- Gujarat Chamber of Commerce and Industry
- M. J. Library
- Town Hall
- Ahmedabad Collectorate
- All India Radio
- Road Transport Office (RTO)
- Vadilal Sarabhai Hospital
- ATMA House

In 2023 the Ahmedabad Municipal Corporation (AMC) announced their redevelopment project of Ashram road called "Gaurav Path". In December 2023 a 850 meter stretch of the road was permanently closed to vehicles as part of the redevelopment. An alternative road was constructed to handle the traffic, connecting directly to the through road at Ramapir Tekra.
