= Ahmedabad Urban Development Authority =

Civilian government body in India

Ahmedabad Development Authority

Type
- Type: Municipal Corporation

History
- Founded: 1978

Website
- AUDA official website

The Ahmedabad Urban Development Authority (AUDA) is a civilian government body responsible for overseeing and sanctioning construction and infrastructure development across the suburbs of the city of Ahmedabad, in the state of Gujarat in India.

== History ==
The Government of Gujarat formed AUDA on 1 February 1978 under Gujarat Town Planning and Urban Development Act, 1976. Initially total 1,294.65 square kilometres (499.87 sq mi) area, the jurisdiction of Ahmedabad Municipal Corporation (AMC) and 164 towns and villages surrounding Ahmedabad, were declared urban development area under AUDA by the Government of Gujarat. In 2007, the limits of AMC expanded by 232 sqkm area from AUDA including Memnagar, Kaligam, Vejalpur, Ranip, Ghatlodia, Vastrapur, Bodakdev and Thaltej in west and Vastral, Nikol, Ramol and Lambha in east.

In 2009, 68 more villages were included under AUDA. In 2021, AMC included Bopal, Ghuma, Chiloda, Naroda gam, land from other seven villages totaling 39 sqkm under it from AUDA.

As of 2023, AMC area; five growth centres: Kalol, Dahegam, Bareja, Mahemdavad and Sanand; and 169 villages of Ahmedabad, Mehsana, Kheda and Gandhinagar districts; totaling 1866 sqkm are under jurisdiction of AUDA.

== Administration ==
The office of AUDA is at Usmanpura, Ashram Road, Ahmedabad. Recently the area of working of AUDA has been limited due to merger of 18 Gram Panchanyats of Ahmedabad district with the Ahmedabad Municipal Corporation. AUDA completed many works in the metro region of Ahmedabad. Bhupendra Patel is the current chairman of AUDA.

AUDA is coming up with a state-of-the-art office on Ashram Road, Ahmedabad. The 22-storeyed structure will be on the lines of the Green Building Concept and will be called the Ahmedabad Habitat Centre.

== Objective ==
Ahmedabad Urban Development Authority consists of a group of non bureaucratic individuals and agencies who are responsible for planning infrastructure development in Indian cities. The individuals are specialised in various aspects of town planning activities.

== Activities ==
Ahmedabad Urban Development Authority planners are responsible for the following.

- Ensuring that Town planning schemes are implemented.
- Creating and implementing development plan of master plan for notified areas.
- Creation and implementation of urban area development initiatives like affordable housing, slum dwellers development.
- Implementation of Local Area Plan for the improvement of existing areas.
- Modernising building laws.
- Transit oriented development is promoted.
- Inclusion of conversion of heritage buildings in local area plans.
- Social and economic development planning.

== Challenges ==
Ahmedabad Urban Development Authority planners are faced with following challenges:

- Meeting housing needs of urban settlers.
- Investment on development initiatives.
- Resolving drinking water issues.
- Resolving sanitation issues.
