= Chinubhai Chimanlal =

Chinubhai Chimanlal also commonly referred to as Chinubhai Mayor (1 November 1901 – 1 August 1993) was industrialist, cotton textile mill owner and one of the scions of Lalbhai group. He was elected as first mayor of Ahmedabad Municipal Corporation.

== Biography ==
He was born on 1 November 1901 to Chimanlal Lalbhai and Laxmiben at Ahmedabad. His father Chimanlal Lalbhai was one of the co-founders of Arvind Lalbhai group along with his younger brothers, Kasturbhai Lalbhai and Narottambhai Lalbhai. Chimanlal, Kasturbhai & other brothers separated in 1920 after which Chimanlal started another textile mill. Chimanlal Lalbhai Centre for Management, Ahmedabad is named after his father.

The Lalbhai family had close relations with the Sarabhais. Chinubhai's sister Manorama, was married to Ambalal Sarabhai's eldest son, Suhrid Sarabhai. Further, the Lalbhai family was also closely related to Hutheesing family of Ahmedabad and Surottam Hutheesing another contemporary textile businessman was his cousin.

After completing his education from Ahmedabad and Varanasi, he graduated with a Bachelor of Arts degree of University of Bombay. Chinubhai married Prabhavatiben in 1950 and couple had a daughter and a son, Urvashi and Rajiv, respectively, from the wedlock.

He joined the family business of textile mills. He joined Saraspur Mills in 1934. He served as Chairman of Ahmedabad Textile Mill's Association's president for year 1964–65.

He was elected as corporator of Ahmedabad Municipality in 1942 and later its head in 1949. In 1950, when Ahmedabad Municipal Corporation was founded he was elected as its Mayor, a post he served till 1962. It was during his tenure city got various libraries, playgrounds, a stadium, an auditorium. He was first to invite noted architect, Le Corbusier to India, who later did many works in India. He had been invited by Chinubhai Chimanbhai and his cousin, Surottam Hutheesing for their own residence. Chinubhai and Hutheesing also commissioned the architect with other projects - like Sanskar Kendra Museum and Mill Owners' Association Building (ATMA House), respectively. Chinubhai is credited to changed the city and corporation functioning. He became so popular that he came to be known by name Chinubhai Mayor. He also served as first Chairman of Gujarat Industrial Development Corporation and Cama Hotel. He also served as Chairman of Gujarat Regional Branch of Indian Institute of Public Administration.

He was also noted for his philanthropy and has been noted for promoting great institutions like the Indian Institute of Management, Ahmedabad, National Institute of Design, the Ahmedabad Textile Industry's Research Association and many more like Shardaben Chimanlal Educational Research Center, Chimanlal Lalbhai Centre for Management, Ahmedabad, Sardhaban Chimanlal Lalbhai Hospital Ahmedabad, Smt. Laxmiben Chimanlal Lalbhai Blood Bank, Smt Chimanlal Lalbhai Gold Medal in medicine.

He died on 1 August 1993 at Ahmedabad.

Shri Chinubhai Chimanbhai Sabhagruh, an auditorium cum community hall has been named after him as a memorial in Ahmedabad.
