= B. V. Doshi =

Indian architect (1927–2023)

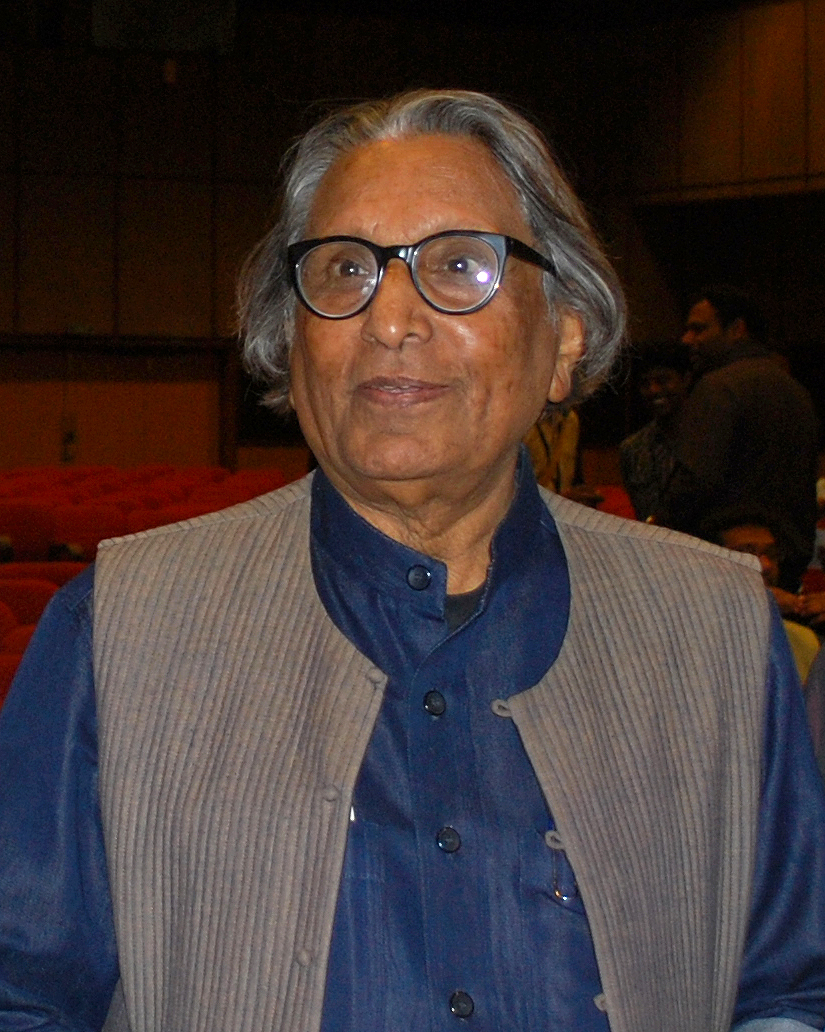
- Doshi in 2013
- Born: Balkrishna Vithaldas Doshi; 26 August 1927; Pune, Bombay Presidency, British India
- Died: 24 January 2023 (aged 95); Ahmedabad, Gujarat, India
- Education: J. J. School of Architecture, Mumbai
- Occupation: Architect
- Spouse: Kamala Parikh (m. 1955)
- Children: 3
- Awards: Padma Vibhushan (posthumous); Padma Bhushan; Padma Shri; Ordre des Arts et des Lettres; Pritzker Prize; Aga Khan Award for Architecture; Royal Gold Medal
- Practice: Vastu Shilpa Consultants
- Buildings: IIM-Bangalore, IIM Udaipur, National Institute of Fashion Technology New Delhi

Balkrishna Vithaldas Doshi (26 August 1927 – 24 January 2023) was an Indian architect. He is an important figure in Indian architecture and noted for his contributions to the evolution of architectural discourse in India. Having worked under Le Corbusier and Louis Kahn, he was a pioneer of modernist and brutalist architecture in India.

His noteworthy designs include FLAME University, IIM Bangalore, IIM Udaipur, NIFT Delhi, Amdavad ni Gufa, CEPT University, and the Aranya Low Cost Housing development in Indore for which was awarded the Aga Khan Award for Architecture. Nalanda International University that was inaugurated by Prime Minister Narendra Modi was designed by him.

In 2018, he became the first Indian architect to receive the Pritzker Architecture Prize. He was also awarded the Padma Shri, the Padma Bhushan, the Padma Vibhushan, and the Royal Institute of British Architects' Royal Gold Medal for 2022.

== Early life ==
Doshi was born to a Gujarati Vaishnav Hindu family in Pune. His mother died when he was 10 months old and his father remarried, with his grandfather and aunts helping raise him. At the age of eleven, he was injured in a fire accident, and thereafter walked with a slight limp. He studied at the Sir J. J. School of Art in Mumbai between 1947 and 1950.

== Career ==
=== Early projects ===
In 1950, he went to Europe. He worked closely with Le Corbusier on the latter's projects in Paris between 1951 and 1954. In 1954, he returned to India to supervise Corbusier's buildings in Ahmedabad, which included the Villa Sarabhai, Villa Shodhan, Mill Owners' Association Building, and Sanskar Kendra. Corbusier is described as having been a major influence on Doshi's later work.

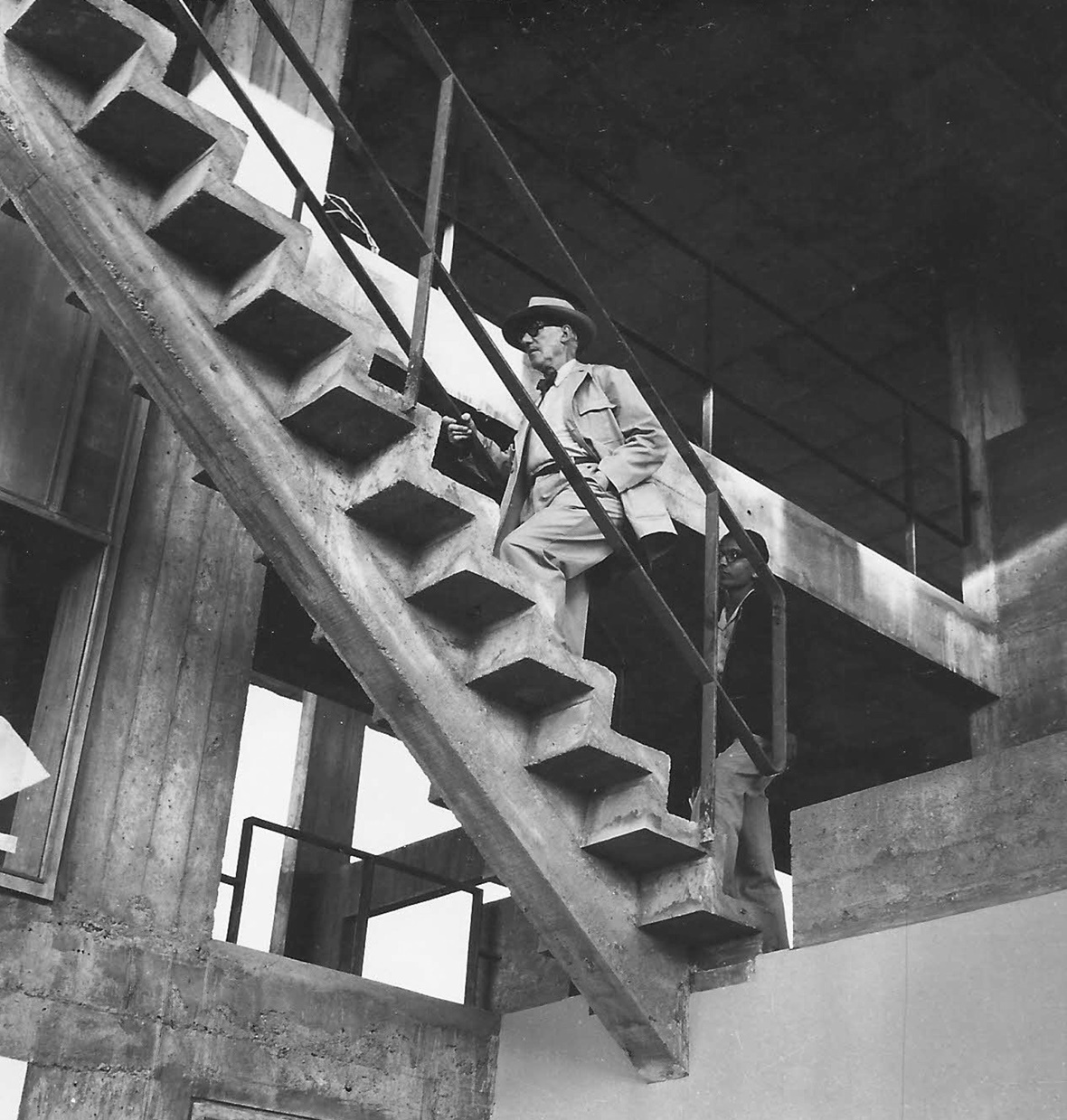
Doshi with Le Corbusier at the unfinished Shodhan House, c. 1955.

His studio, Vastu-Shilpa (environmental design), was established in 1955. Doshi worked closely with Louis Kahn and Anant Raje, when Kahn designed the campus of the Indian Institute of Management, Ahmedabad. In 1958 he was a fellow at the Graham Foundation for Advanced Studies in the Fine Arts. He then started the School of Architecture (S.A) in 1962.

==== Bimanagar ====
Bimanagar Housing Society, located at Ahmedabad is one of the well-known project by Shri B.V Doshi. He once said, "One of my most favourite housing projects is the one I designed for Life Insurance Corporation, at Ahmedabad. Here I knew that the houses would be occupied by several generations of the same family, that they would identify with it, that there will be a strong sense of belonging and that their needs will change, and they may modify parts of it.”

=== Teaching ===
Apart from his international fame as an architect, Doshi is equally known for having been an educator and institution builder. He was the founding director of the School of Architecture, Ahmedabad (1962–72), founding director of the School of Planning (1972–79), founding dean of the Centre for Environmental Planning and Technology (1972–81), founding member of the Visual Arts Centre, Ahmedabad, and founding director of the Kanoria Centre for Arts, Ahmedabad.

Doshi was instrumental in establishing the nationally- and internationally-known research institute Vastu-Shilpa Foundation for Studies and Research in Environmental Design. The institute has performed pioneering work in low-cost housing and city planning. He is noteworthy for his pioneering work on low-income housing, and for his designs that incorporate concepts of sustainability in innovative ways.

=== Media ===
In 2008, Hundredhands director Premjit Ramachandran released a documentary interviewing Doshi. He appeared as himself in Mani Ratnam's O Kadhal Kanmani and Shaad Ali's Ok Jaanu.

== Style ==
Doshi said that he had been inspired by historic Indian monuments, as well as the work of European and American architects.

== Personal life and death ==
Doshi married Kamala Parikh in 1955. They had three daughters – Tejal, Radhika, and Maneesha. Tejal Panthaki is a textile designer, Radhika Kathpalia is an architect and fashion designer, and Maneesha Akkitham is a painter. Khushnu Panthaki Hoof is Doshi's grand daughter and architect and currently head Balkrishna Doshi Archives and Vastushilpa Foundation. She along with her husband Sönke Hoof are Principal Architects of Studio Sangath.

Doshi died in Ahmedabad, Gujarat on 24 January 2023, at age 95.

== Recognition ==
Doshi was a fellow of the Royal Institute of British Architects and sat on the selection committee for the Pritzker Prize, the Indira Gandhi National Centre for the Arts, and the Aga Khan Award for Architecture. He was also a fellow of the Indian Institute of Architects.

Doshi's work on the reunification of Indian and English heritages through his practice was awarded a Global Award for Sustainable Architecture in 2007, the award's first edition. The award recognized Doshi's significant step in the direction of an alternative development model.

In March 2018, Doshi was awarded the Pritzker Architecture Prize, the Nobel equivalent for the field, thus becoming the first Indian to receive the honour. The Pritzker jury announced that Doshi "has always created an architecture that is serious, never flashy or a follower of trends", and noted his "deep sense of responsibility and a desire to contribute to his country and its people through high quality, authentic architecture".

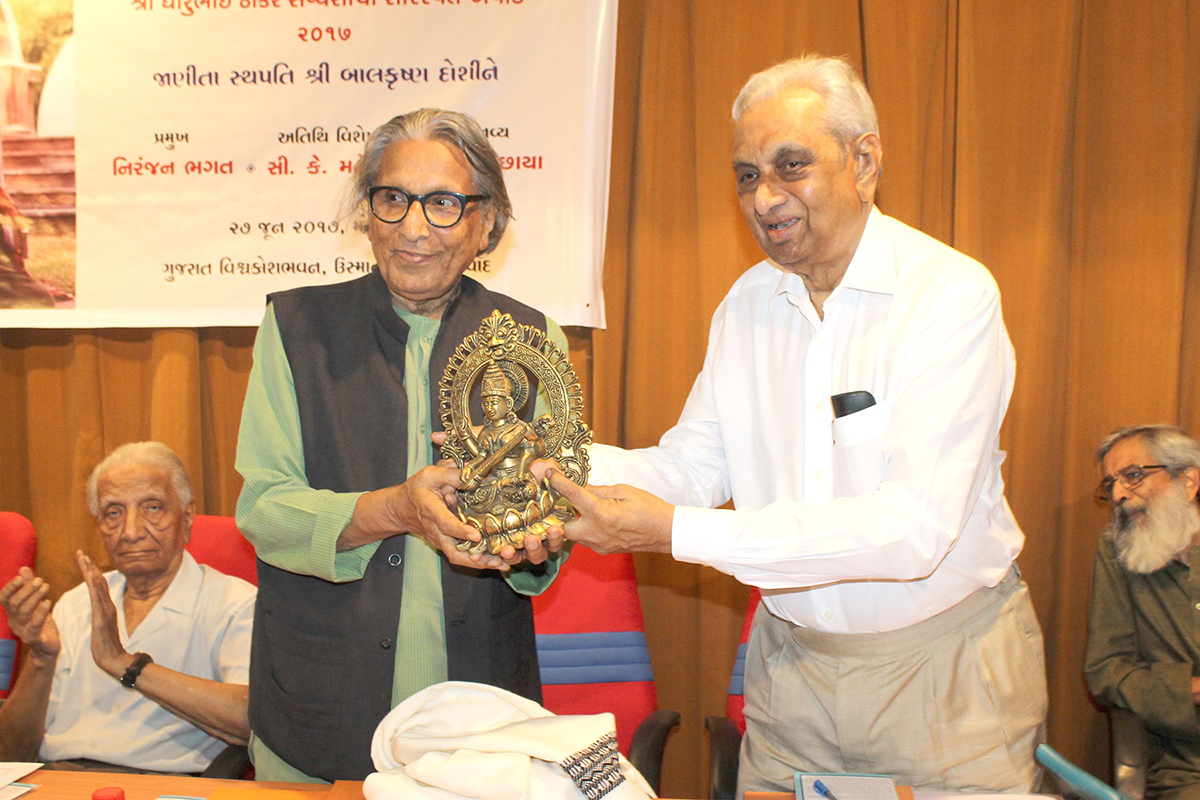
C. K. Mehta presenting the Dhirubhai Thakar Savyasachi Saraswat Award to Doshi on 27 June 2017

- Padma Vibhushan (posthumous), Government of India, 2023
- Royal Gold Medal, Royal Gold Medal for Architecture, Government of United Kingdom, 2022
- Padma Bhushan, Government of India, 2020
- Dhirubhai Thakar Savyasachi Saraswat Award, 2017
- Pritzker Architecture Prize, 2018
- Global Award for Sustainable Architecture, 2007 (first edition)
- Padma Shri, Government of India, 1976
- Honorary doctorate from the University of Pennsylvania
- Officer of the Order of Arts and Letters, France, 2011
- 6th Aga Khan Award for Architecture for Aranya Community Housing, 1993–1995

== Buildings ==
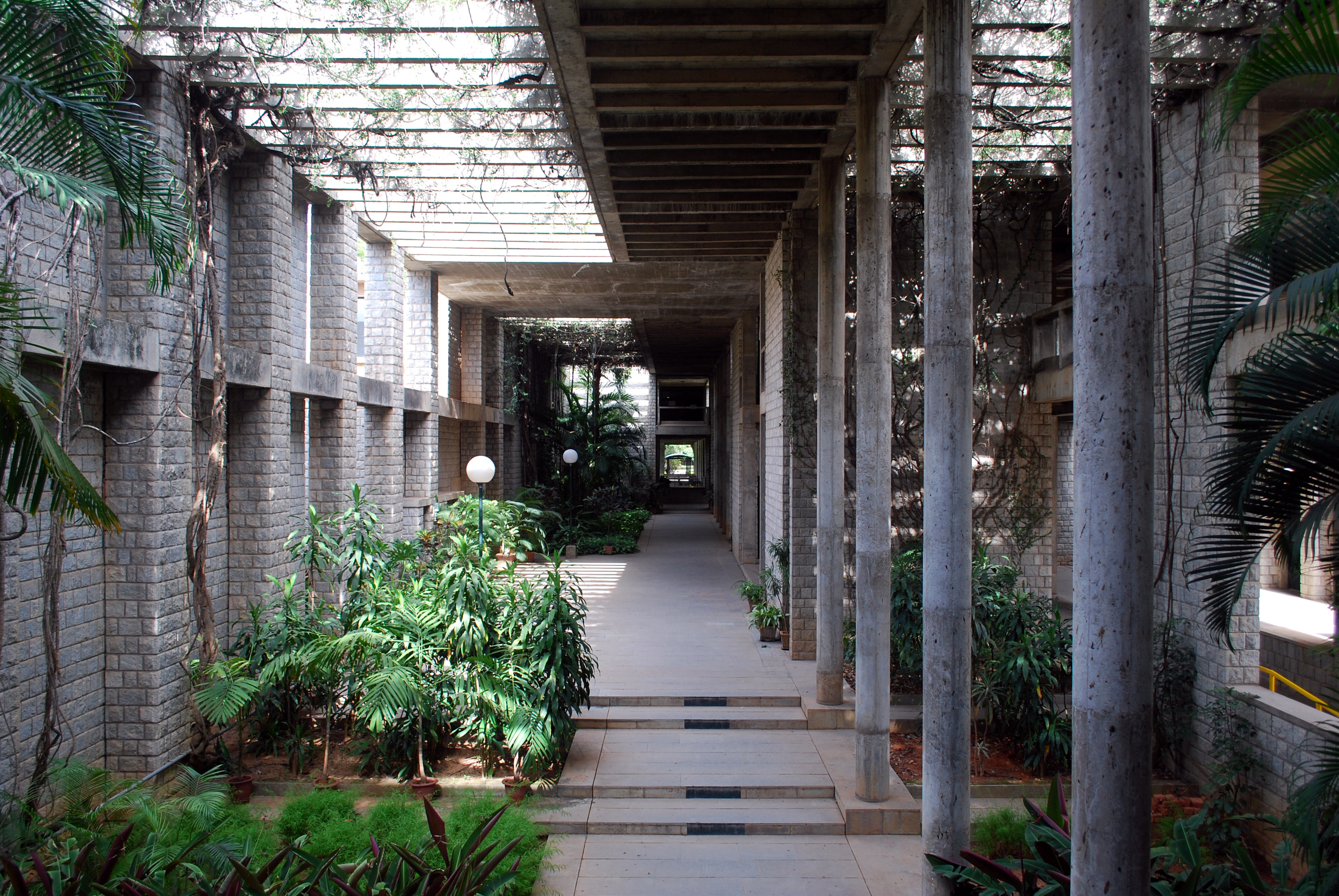
Academic Block of IIM-Bangalore

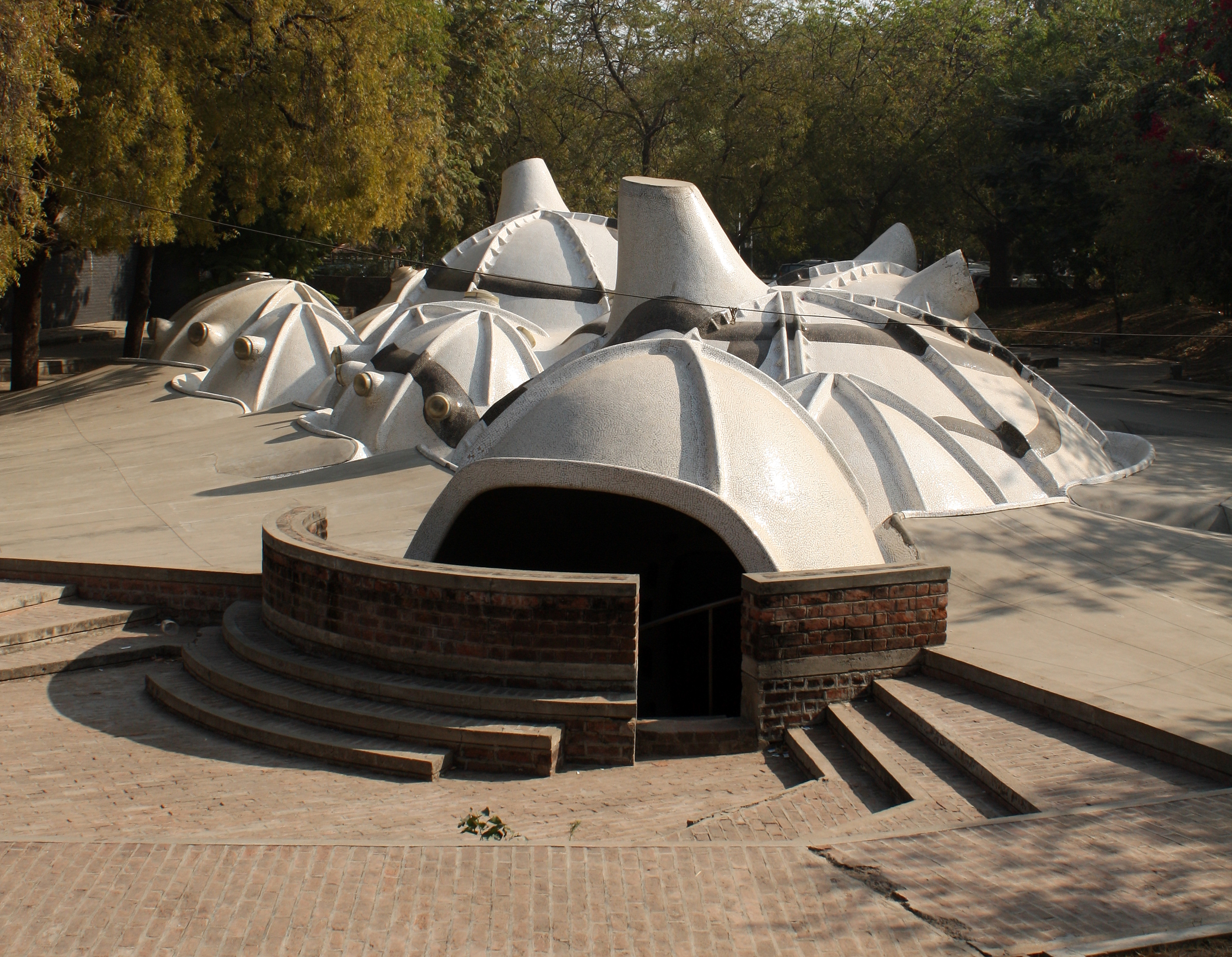
Husain-Doshi Gufa, Ahmedabad

- 1962 – Institute of Indology, Ahmedabad
- 1966 – Centre for Environment and Planning Technology (CEPT), Ahmedabad
- 1967 – Tagore Memorial Hall, Ahmedabad
- 1972 – ECIL Township, Hyderabad.
- 1973 – IFFCO township, Kalol
- 1976 – Premabhai Hall, Ahmedabad
- 1977 – Indian Institute of Management, Bangalore
- 1979 – Sangath, B. V. Doshi's office, Ahmedabad
- 1979 – Shakti Bhavan, Administrative Office of M. P. Electricity Board, Jabalpur
- 1979 – Mahatma Gandhi Labour Institute
- 1982 – Aranya Low Cost Housing, Indore
- 1984 – Vidyadhar Nagar, Jaipur
- 1984 – Lalbhai Dalpatbhai Museum, Ahmedabad
- 1989 – National Institute of Fashion Technology, Delhi
- 1990 – Amdavad ni Gufa, Ahmedabad
- 1997 – Sawai Gandharva Smarak, Pune
- 2002 – Udayan the Condoville, Udita (HIG), Utsav (MIG) Utsarg (LIG) 2500 homes, Kolkata
