= Pranlal Patel =

Indian photographer

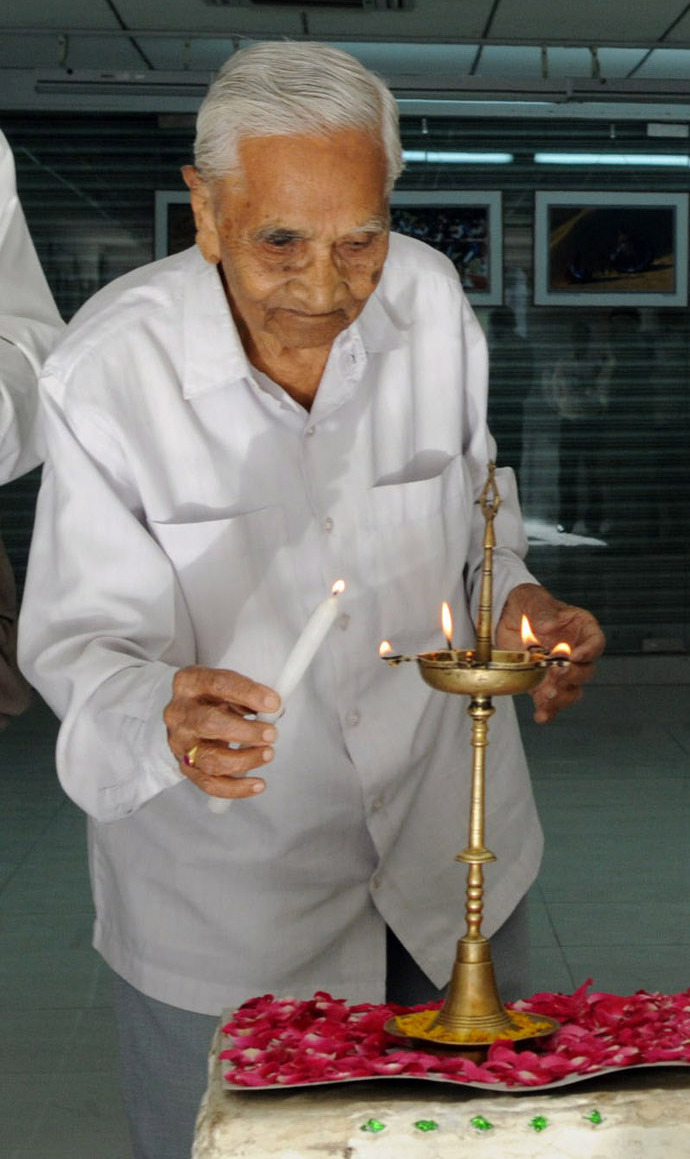
Pranlal Patel inaugurating the exhibition in 2012

Pranlal Karamshibhai Patel (1 January 1910 – 18 January 2014) was a photographer from Gujarat, India. He had career spanning eight decades.

== Biography ==
Patel was born in Keshiya (now in Jamnagar district, Gujarat, India). Patel received training in photography starting in 1932 from Balwant Bhatt and Ravishankar Raval, initially using a box camera. He later used cameras such as the Super Ikonta (from 1936), Rolleiflex (from 1939), and Nikon.

His work is primarily in black and white photography and is described in terms of art as belonging to the pictorial style, which emphasizes delicate emotional expression and prioritizes beauty, making it appealing to the general public. Patel's photographs gained widespread recognition in numerous popular and prestigious magazines and exhibitions in Gujarat, India, and internationally due to this artistic approach.

Patel extensively documented rural life in India, its historical buildings, and its natural beauty through his photography from 1933 to 1989, earning him numerous national awards. He also received international accolades in 1942, 1964, 1966, and 1976. In 2013–14, an exhibition of his photographs, titled Refocusing the Lens: Pranlal K. Patel's Photographs of Women at Work in Ahmedabad, was held at Hamilton College in New York State, USA.

Beyond documenting the lives of ordinary citizens, Patel is also remembered for his photographs of prominent Indian leaders such as Mahatma Gandhi, Jawaharlal Nehru, and Sardar Patel.

Patel established the Patel Photo Studio in 1945 opposite Ahmedabad Town Hall. Throughout his long career, he mentored numerous photographers. He also played a key role in promoting photography education and its organized institutional structure by founding the Niharika Club of Photography in Ahmedabad in 1939 and the Camera Club of Karnavati in Ahmedabad in 1980.

He died on 18 January 2014 in Ahmedabad.

== Awards and recognition ==
- Gaurav Puraskar by the Gujarat Government in 1990.
- Lifetime Achievement Award by the Ministry of Information and Broadcasting, Government of India, in 2011.
- Kailash Kala Award by Morari Bapu at the 'Asmita Parv' held in Talgajarda near Mahuva in 2013.
- Other significant awards include recognitions from the Photo Kala Club (Amreli) (2005), Federation of Indian Photography Convention (2010), Federation of Senior Photographer (2010), 'Niharika' The Society of Gujarat Pictorialists Award (2011), the Photo Division Award from the Ministry of Information and Broadcasting (2011), Indubhai Parekh School of Architecture Award (Rajkot) (2011), Sanskar Dham Award (2011), Nilkanth Patangnagar Pratibha Award (2012), Manav Pratishthan Award by Shrimati V. M. Modi Educational & Charitable Trust (2012), Kailash Lalit Kala Award (2013), and Rajkot Photographers Association Award (2013).
