= Claude Batley =

English architect in India (1879–1956)

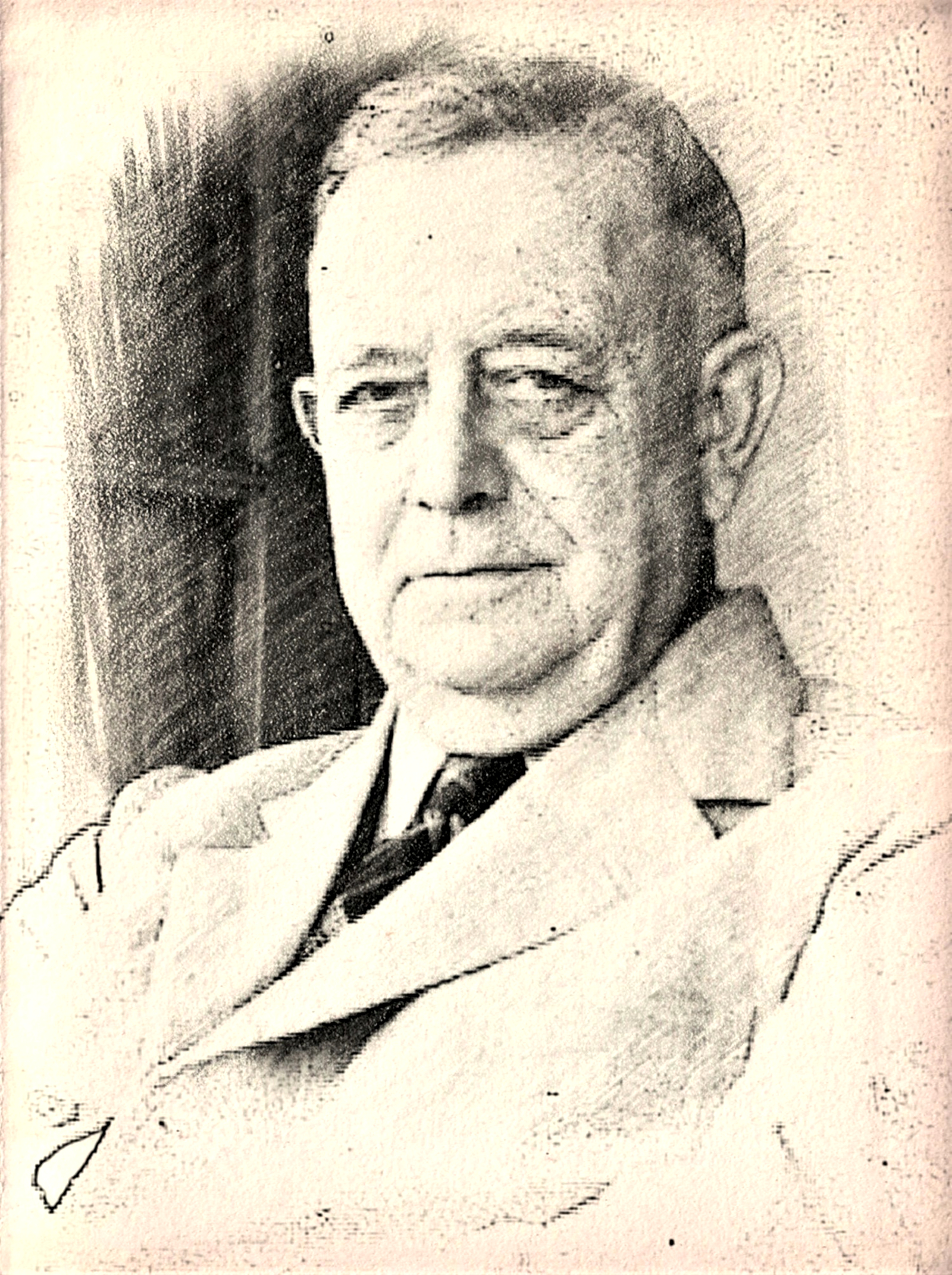
- Born: October 17, 1879; Ipswich
- Died: March 20, 1956 (aged 76); Bombay
- Occupation: architect
- Known for: role in development of modern architecture in India

Claude Batley F.R.I.B.A., F.I.A.A., (17 October 1879 in Ipswich – 20 March 1956, Bombay) was an English architect who as practitioner, teacher and President of the Indian Institute of Architects from 1921 to 1923, played an influential role in development of modern architecture in India in the first half of the 20th century.

== Career ==
Born in Ipswich in 1879 and educated at Ipswich School, Batley served his articles locally and in London leaving for India in 1913. In Bombay he started a successful independent architectural practice in 1917 with partners Gregson and King, a firm of architects which is still extant under the name of Gregson, Batley and King.

Among his works are the Bombay Gymkhana (1917); Lincoln House (1933), previously Wankaner House, Breach Candy; Bombay Central Station (1930); Dariya Mahal, residence of Maharaja of Cutch (1930), South Court (1936), residence of Mohamed Ali Jinnah; Round Building (1937); Cusrow Baug in Colaba Causeway (1937–59) and its Agiary, known as The Seth Nusserwanji Hirji Karani Agiary (1938); Bombay Club (1939) later Hotel Nataraj and now Inter-Continental Mumbai, Lalbhai House (1942) and Breach Candy Hospital (1950).

He became a visiting professor in the J. J. School of Art in the year 1914, and its principal in the year 1923. He held this post for a period of 20 years, during which he took his students on trips all over the country making measure drawings of buildings of architectural significance. He spent a lot of time in research and documented Jaipur's architecture. He was the president of the "Bombay Architectural Association" (now merged into The Indian Institute of Architects) from 1925 to 1926.

He died 1956 in one of the buildings he had designed – The Bombay Club.

== Buildings ==
- Bombay Gymkhana (1917)
- Lincoln House, Mumbai (1933)
- Ahmedabad Town Hall
- M. J. Library
- Vijali Ghar
- Shodhan House, Ahmedabad
- Jinnah House
- Breach Candy Hospital
