= Cusrow Baug =

Residential colony in Mumbai

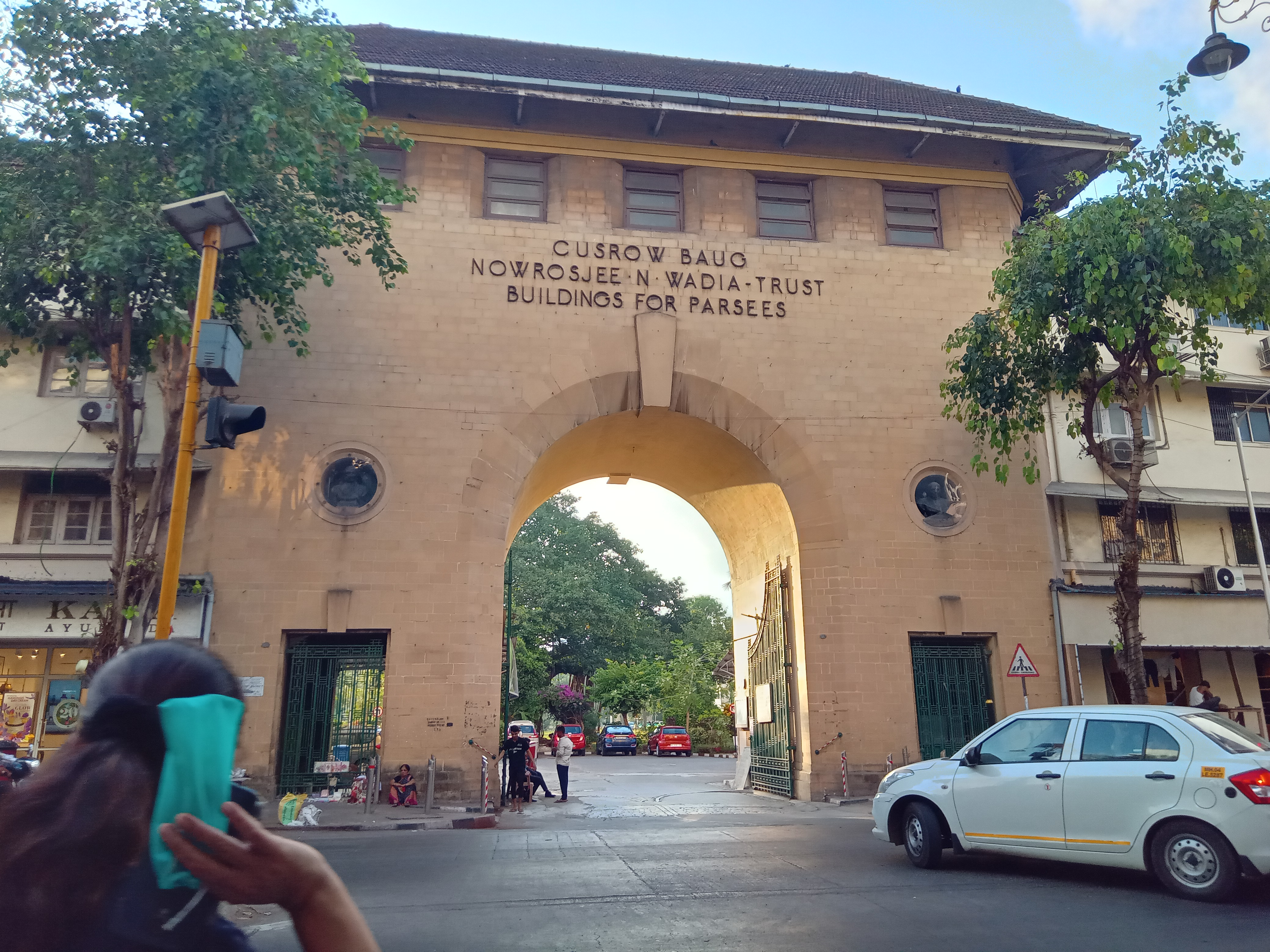
- Gate of Cusrow Baug
- Location in Mumbai

General information
- Location: Colaba Causeway, Mumbai, India
- Coordinates: 18.9204°N 72.8291°E
- Status: Completed
- Area: 84,000 square yards (70,000 m^{2})
- No. of blocks: 17

Construction
- Constructed: 1934–1959
- Architect: Claude Batley

Other information
- Governing body: R. N. Wadia Trust

Cusrow Baug is a Parsi residential colony on Colaba Causeway, Mumbai, India. Its residential blocks were completed between 1934 and 1959. The colony houses a Zoroastrian temple, computer centre, gymnasium, and sports club. It was designed by Claude Batley.

== History ==
Following his death, Parsi businessman Nowrosjee N. Wadia left a large amount of money to his wife Jerbai Wadia. She used it to build five residential colonies, known as baugs, and create funds for Parsis who were unable to afford housing. These five baugs, created in honour of her husband and three sons, are called Cusrow Baug, Ness Baug, Rustom Baug, Jer Baug, and Nowroze Baug. They contain a total of 1545 apartments. The baugs are maintained by N. N. Wadia and R. N. Wadia Trusts under the Bombay Parsi Punchayet. The managing committee is chaired by a member of the Wadia family.

Cusrow Baug was designed by English architect Claude Batley. The first residential blocks of the colony were completed in 1934, after two years of construction. The S and T blocks were completed in 1959. It is one of the oldest Parsi colonies in Mumbai. The houses in the colony are not for sale and are only available to be rented. During the 1950s, because the colony was located near a swamp, it had only a few tenants even at a minimal rent of ₹40 (equivalent to ₹4,400 or US$46 in 2023) per month.

The Seth Nusserwanji Hirji Karani Agiary, a Zoroastrian fire temple, is located in the colony. The holy fire of the temple was originally lit at Nizam Street on 16 March 1847. It was later moved to Sodawaterwalla Agiary for some time, and then moved to the colony on the night of 22–23 February 1935. On 21 March 1959, Sir Cusrow Wadia Pavilion was opened for sporting activities.

== Features ==
The residential blocks of the colony are labelled in alphabetical order, beginning from A to U, except for I, L, N, and O, which are absent.

The colony covers an area of 84,000 square yards (70,000 m^{2}) and can house more than 500 families. It has a computer centre, a gymnasium, and a sports club called Cusrow Baug United Sports and Welfare League. The social activity cell of the colony conducts religious classes and provides scholarships.

The Seth Nusserwanji Hirji Karani Agiary is built on a plot measuring 1,400 square yards (1,200 m^{2}).
