= Indian Institute of Architects =

Indian organization for architects

- Abbreviation: IIA
- Formation: May 12, 1917; 109 years ago
- Type: Learned Society
- Legal status: Registered Society
- Professional title: Architect
- Headquarters: Dadabhai Naoroji Road, Mumbai, India
- President: Vilas Vasant Avachat
- Vice President: Jitendra Mehta; Tushar Sogani
- Treasurer: B. Sudhir
- Jt. Hon. Secretaries: Ranee M.L. Vedamuthu; Sandeep Bawdekar; Akshaya Kumar Beuria
- Main organ: Journal of the Indian Institute of Architects (JIIA)
- Affiliations: CAA; UIA
- Website: Official Website
- Formerly called: The Architectural Student’s Association (1917- 1922); The Bombay Architectural Association (1922-1929)

The Indian Institute of Architects (IIA) is a learned society of architects, established in 1917. It has headquarters in Dadabhai Naoroji Road, Mumbai, India. IIA is a member of International Union of Architects (UIA), Commonwealth Association of Architects (CAA) and South Asian Association for Regional Cooperation of Architects (SAARCH).

== Overview ==
The Indian Institute of Architects (IIA) is a learned society of architects. It was established in 1917 as the Architectural Students' Association and renamed as Indian Institute of Architects in 1929. Currently, its headquarters is located in Dadabhai Naoroji Road, Mumbai, India.

The main body of IIA is General Body, which comprises all the members under the following categories:

- Fellow (F.I.I.A.)
- Associate (A.I.I.A.)
- Licentiate (L.I.I.A.)

Fellows and Associates have the right to vote on all matter. Licentiate have the right to vote in all matters except for amending the Constitution and Bye-laws. Additionally, IIA grants Honorary Fellowship (Hon. F.I.I.A.) to those who have made a significant contribution to the promotion of art and architecture.

== History ==
=== Origin ===
==== Formal education ====
John Begg, consulting architect for the Government of India, observed a shortage of architectural professionals in the country. To address this, he started a technical course in architectural drafting at Sir J.J. School of Art in Bombay (present-day Mumbai). This course extended architectural drafting training to Indian students. In 1907, the Government began granting a Draftsman’s Certificate upon completion, allowing graduates to work as drafters in the Drawing Offices of the Public Works Department.

In 1908, George Wittet, Consulting Architect to the Government of Bombay, transformed the course into a four-year architectural curriculum to address the need for skilled architectural assistants within the Public Works Department. Wittet largely taught the course, supported by other qualified members of his staff.

By 1913, a dedicated Department of Architecture had been established. Robert William Cable, previously an academic staff of the Architectural Association School in London, was recruited to head the new department.

As the number of private architectural firms in India grew, so did the demand for fully trained architects. In response, Claude Batley, principal architect at the prominent Bombay-based firm Gregson, Batley & King, collaborated with Professor Robert William Cable to expand the curriculum into a comprehensive five-year professional diploma program. Later, Henry Foster King, Claude Batley's partner at Gregson, Batley & King, took over as head of the department.

==== Student association ====
During Henry Foster King’s tenure in 1917, newly graduated students of Department of Architecture at Sir J.J. School of Art and their instructors formed the Architectural Students' Association. George Wittet was elected as first president of the association.

==== Professional association ====
As the number of members practicing as architects increased, the Architectural Students' Association was renamed the Bombay Architectural Association in 1922. The association was reorganized with changes in its constitution and bye-laws. In 1925, the Bombay Architectural Association gained affiliation with Royal Institute of British Architects (RIBA).

In 1929, the association was renamed as the Indian Institute of Architects (IIA) and registered as a society under the Societies Registration Act.

== Membership ==
=== Fellow ===
The IIA awards fellowships to architects through an election by the National Council. Fellows can vote on matters, run for President, Vice-President, officer positions, and National Council member. Fellows may use the post-nominals F.I.I.A. (Fellow of the Indian Institute of Architects).

Eligibility for election as a fellow differs for non-members and associate members. Non-members or associate members who are fellows of an architectural society recognized by the National Council qualify for election, as do those with 14 years of practice and notable contributions to architecture. Associate members also qualify if they have spent 7 years as a principal architect or head of an architectural school since becoming associate members.

=== Associate ===
The IIA awards associateship to architects either through an election by the National Council or by examination from the Board of Examinations. Associates can vote on matters and run for National Council member. They can run for officer positions except for President and Vice-President. Associates may use the post-nominals A.I.I.A. (Associate of the Indian Institute of Architects).

Architects registered with the Council of Architecture qualify for election as an Associate. Additionally, IIA offers associate membership through examination for individuals possessing 5 years of work experience under the supervision of an employer, who is an architect registered with the Council of Architecture and is an IIA member. The required working experience is relaxed for individuals possessing a 3-year long diploma in Architectural Assistantship, Interior Design and Civil Engineering.

== Facilities ==
=== Sohrab F. Bharoocha Architectural Library ===
The Sohrab F. Bharoocha Architectural Library was established in 1929 to honor Sohrab Framji Bharoocha, the eighth president. He served from 1927 until his death, during the time when the association was known as the Bombay Architectural Association.

The library is open for all the members and students of the IIA. The library is managed and operated by the IIA Library Committee.

== Publications ==
=== Journal of the Indian Institute of Architects ===
The Journal of the Indian Institute of Architects is a monthly, peer-reviewed, open access publication focused on architecture, urbanism, and planning. It is available in both print and online formats.

== Awards ==
=== Baburao Mhatre Gold Medal ===
IIA awards Baburao Mhatre Gold Medal to distinguished architects for their lifetime contribution to architectural profession. The award is named after Gajanan Baburao Mhatre, who designed and executed many Art Deco buildings across neighbourhoods of Mumbai, shaping Mumbai’s landscape.

The IIA Baburao Mhatre Gold Medal was first awarded in 1984 to architect Achyut Kanvinde. Notable winners include Charles Correa (1987), B.V. Doshi (1988), Raj Rewal (1989), and Laurie Baker (1990).

=== Madhav Achwal Gold Medal ===
IIA awards Madhav Achwal Gold Medal to distinguished educator for their lifetime contribution to architectural education. The award is named after Madhav Achwal, who dedicated his life to architectural education, promoting aesthetic, scientific and practical efficiency of the profession.

The IIA Madhav Achwal Gold Medal was first awarded in 1988 to architect B.V. Doshi. Notable winners include Professor Cyrus SH Jhabvala (1990) and Professor Khulbhushan Jain (1992).

== Chapters ==
The IIA is organized into Chapters for states and union territories of India, along with Centres and Sub-centres for cities and towns.

The following is the list of Chapters, Centres and Sub-centres:

- Andhra Pradesh Chapter
  - Kakinada Centre
  - Vishakhapatnam Centre
- Assam Chapter
- Bihar Chapter
- Chandigarh Chapter
- Chhattisgarh Chapter
  - Bilaspur Centre
  - Durg Bhillai Centre
  - Raipur Centre
  - Rajnandgaon Sub-centre
- Goa Chapter
- Gujrat Chapter
  - Ahmedabad Centre
  - Saurashtra Centre
  - Surat Centre
  - Vadodara Centre
  - Charotar Sub-centre
  - Mehsana-Gandhinagar Sub-centre
- Haryana Chapter
  - Faridabad Centre
  - Gurgaon Centre
  - Hisar Centre
  - Hubli Centre
  - Panchkula Centre
  - Ambala Sub-centre
  - Karnal-Kurukshetra Sub-centre
  - Sonepat Sub-centre
- Himachal Pradesh Chapter
  - Dharamshala Centre
  - Shimla Centre
- Jammu & Kashmir Chapter
- Jharkhand Chapter
- Karnataka Chapter
  - Belgaum Centre
  - Kalaburagi Centre
  - Mangalore Centre
  - Mysore Centre
  - Vijayapur Centre
- Kerala Chapter
  - Calicut Centre
  - Cochin Centre
  - Kannur Centre
  - Kollam Centre
  - Kottayam Centre
  - Malappuram Centre
  - Palakkad Centre
  - Thiruvananthapuram Centre
  - Thrissur Centre
- Madhya Pradesh Chapter
  - Bhopal Centre
  - Gwalior Centre
  - Indore Centre
  - Jabalpur Sub-centre
  - Vindhya Sub-centre
- Maharashtra Chapter
  - Ahmednagar Centre
  - Akola Centre
  - Aurangabad Centre
  - Brihan Mumbai Centre
  - Dhule Centre
  - Jalgaon Centre
  - Kalyan Centre
  - Kolhapur Centre
  - Lonavala Centre
  - Nagpur Centre
  - Nashik Centre
  - Navi Mumbai Centre
  - Pimpri-Chinchwad Centre
  - Pune Centre
  - Sangli Centre
  - Satara Centre
  - Solapur Centre
  - Thane Centre
  - Yavatmal Centre
  - Amravati Sub-centre
  - Gondia Sub-centre
  - Karad Sub-centre
  - Nandurbar Sub-centre
  - Talegaon Dabhade Sub-centre
- Odisha Chapter
  - Rourkela Centre
  - Cuttack Sub-centre
  - Sambalpur Sub-centre
- Punjab Chapter
  - Amritsar Centre
  - Jalandhar Centre
  - Ludhiana Centre
  - Mohali Centre
  - Patiala Centre
  - Bathinda Sub-centre
  - Kapurthala Hoshiarpur Sub-centre
- Rajasthan Chapter
  - Jodhpur Centre
  - Kota Sub-centre
  - Udaipur Sub-centre
- Tamil Nadu Chapter
  - Chennai Centre
  - Coimbatore Centre
  - Madurai Centre
  - Salem Centre
  - Trichy Centre
  - Puducherry Centre
  - Thanjavur Sub-centre
- Telangana Chapter
- Uttar Pradesh Chapter
  - Bareilly Centre
  - Noida Centre
- Uttarakhand Chapter
  - Kumaun Centre
  - Roorkee Centre
- West Bengal Chapter
