= Vijali Ghar =

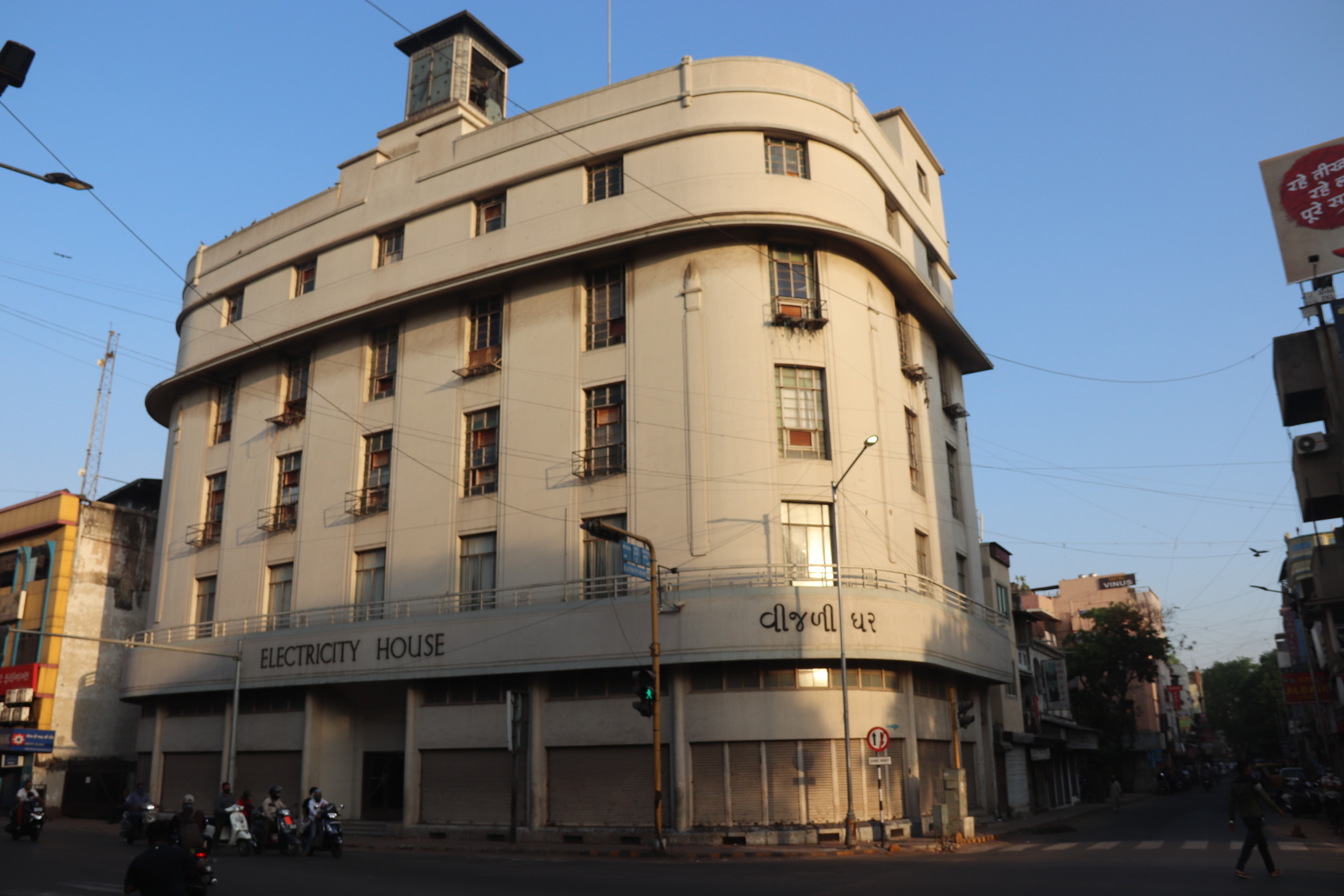
- Interactive map of the Vijali Ghar area
- Alternative names: Electricity House

General information
- Type: Office building
- Architectural style: Art Deco
- Location: Relief Road, Ahmedabad, India
- Coordinates: 23.02627366°N 72.58158728°E
- Completed: 1938
- Owner: Torrent Power

Technical details
- Material: Bricks and concrete

Design and construction
- Architect: Claude Batley

Vijali Ghar, also known as Electricity House, is an office building on Relief Road, Ahmedabad, Gujarat, India. It is an Art Deco building designed by Claude Batley.

== History ==
Vijali Ghar was built in 1938. The building was a headquarters of the Ahmedabad Electricity Company. It now houses the office of Torrent Power, which distributes electricity in the city.

== Architecture ==
Vijali Ghar is an Art Deco building designed by Claude Batley. The plain façade of the building follows the curve of the road, highlighted by horizontal lines. The main block is separated from the attic by a concrete chhajja. It was built with reinforced concrete. It also used tubular pipes for rails.

== Gallery ==
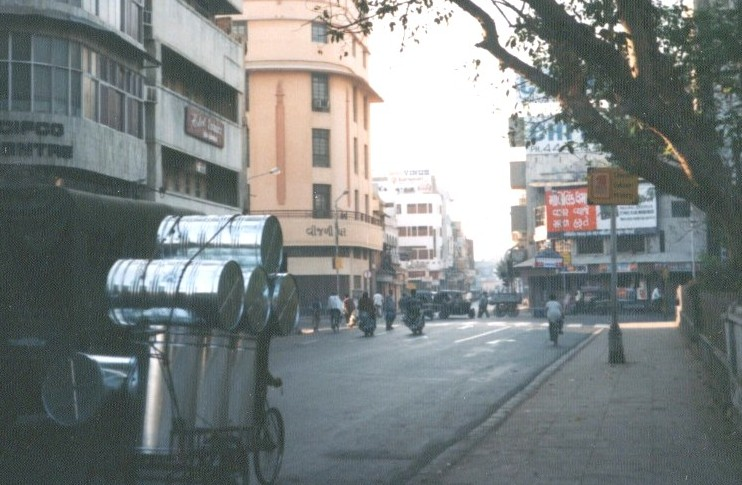
Vijali Ghar located at the crossroads

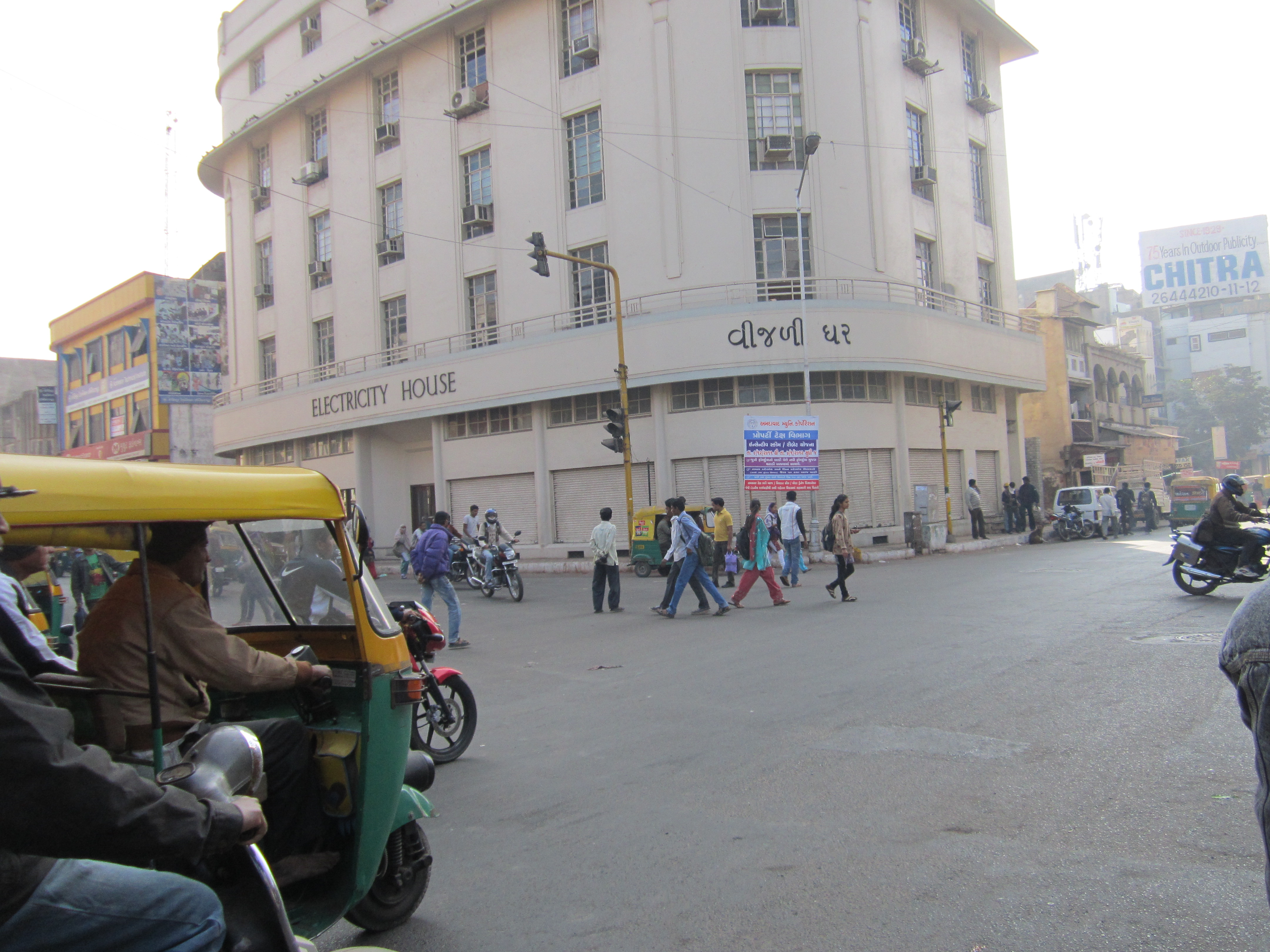
Corner of the building

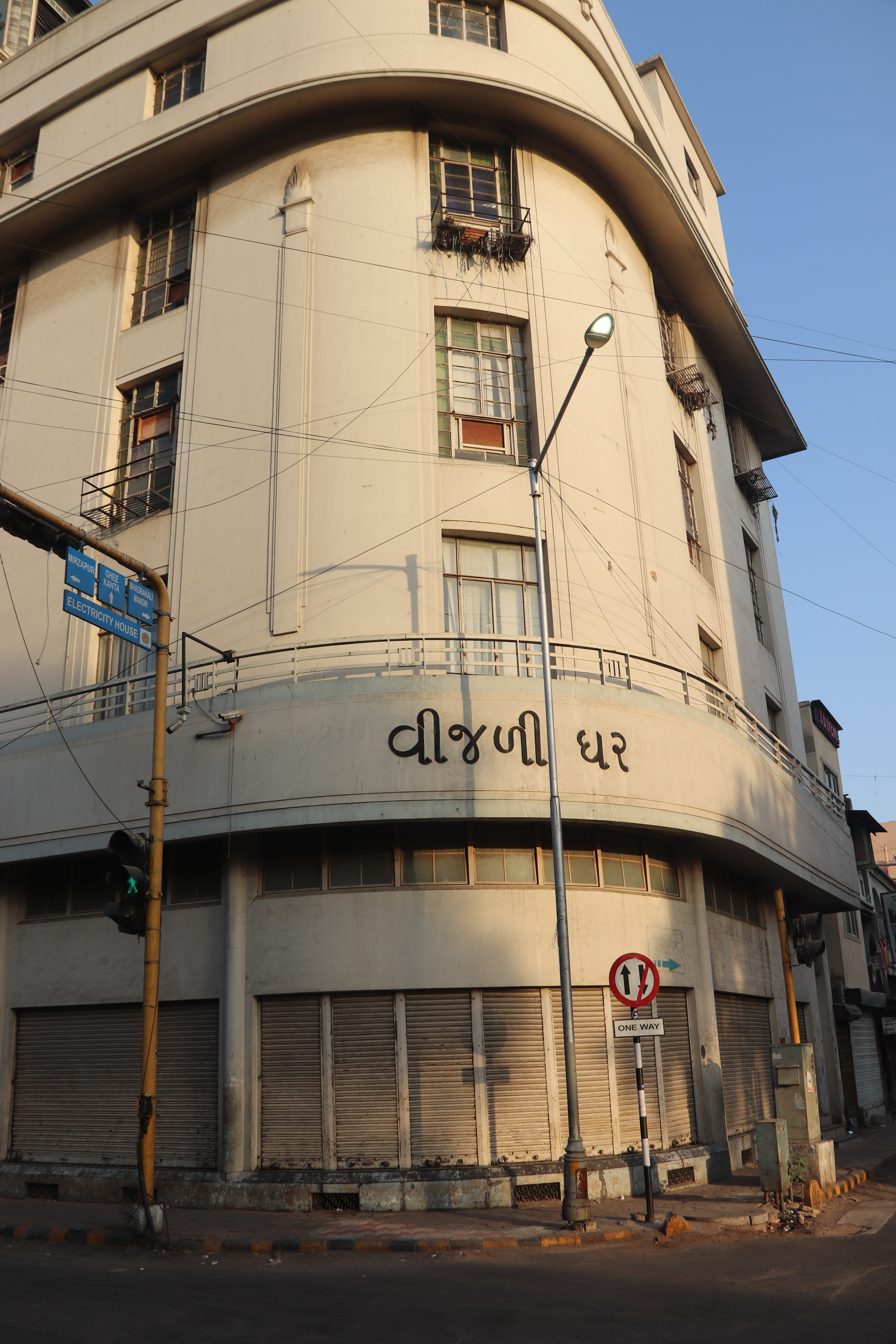
Gujarati lettering

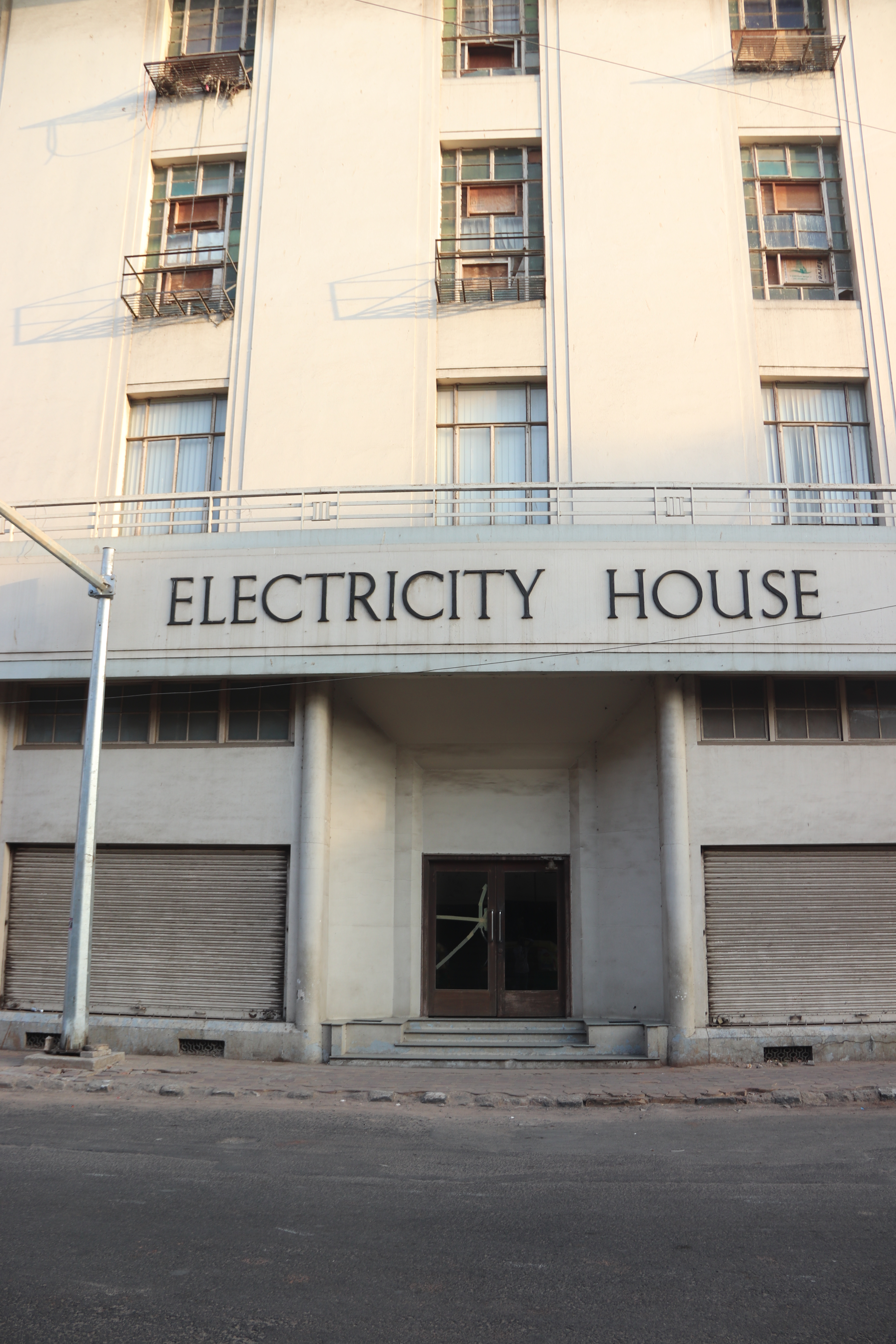
English lettering

== See also ==
- Ahmedabad Town Hall
- M. J. Library
- Tagore Memorial Hall
