= M. J. Library =

Public library in Ahmedabad, India

- Sheth Maneklal Jethabhai Pustakalaya
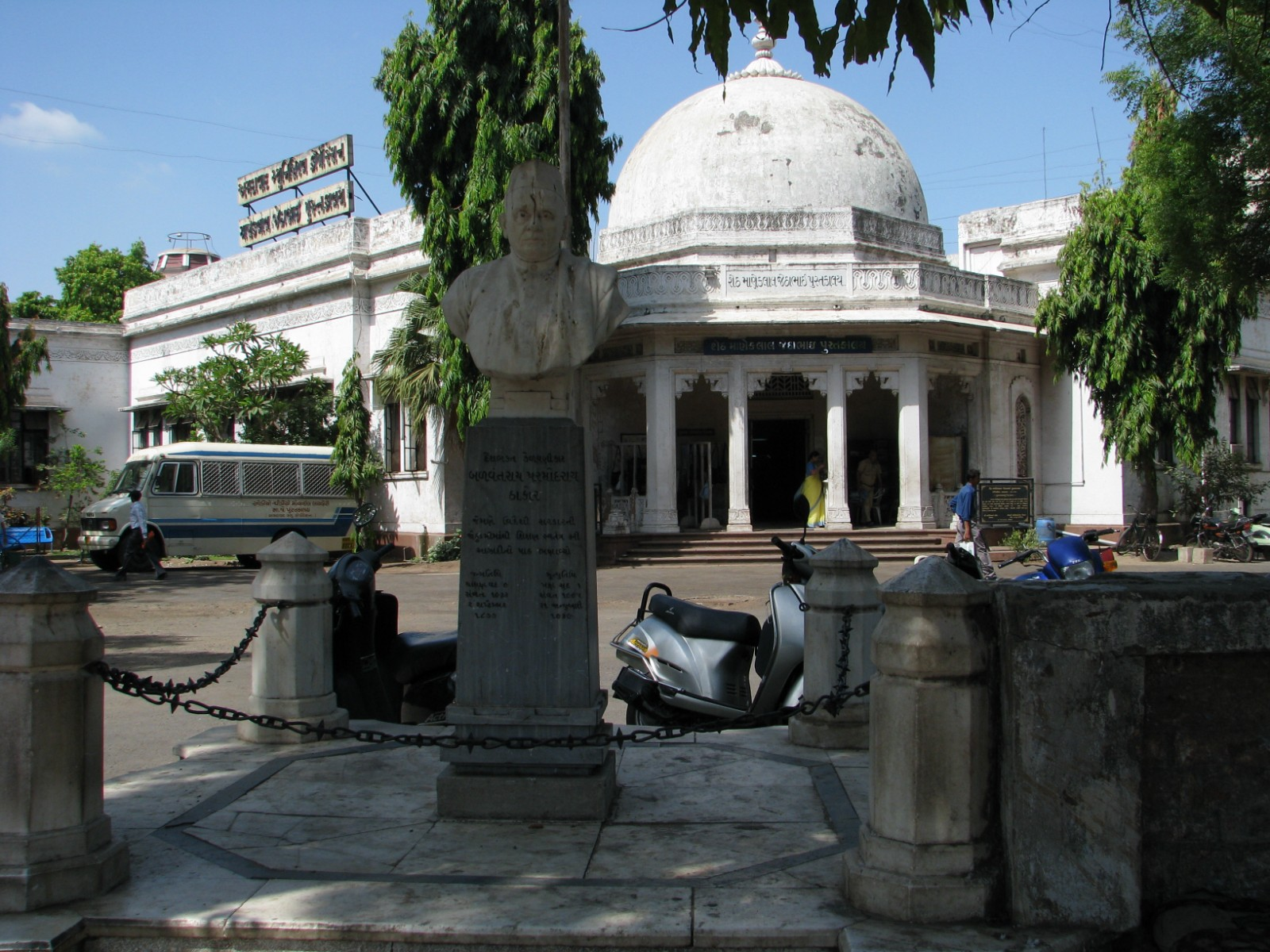
- 23.023312°N 72.571188°E
- Location: Ahmedabad, Gujarat, India
- Type: Public library
- Established: 15 April 1938; 87 years ago
- Architect: Claude Batley
- Service area: Ahmedabad

Other information
- Website: www.mjlibrary.in

M. J. Library or Sheth Maneklal Jethabhai Pustakalaya is a public library in Ellisbridge, Ahmedabad, India.

== History ==
Mahatma Gandhi proposed to construct a public library by the collection of books he had at Sabarmati Ashram. Gandhi donated approx 7,000-15,000 books to start this library.

It was named after Maneklal Jethabhai; father of Rasiklal Maneklal, who donated to construct this library. It was inaugurated by Vallabhbhai Patel on 15 April 1938.

== Architecture ==
The architectural design of library was done by Claude Batley. It is built in Rajputana Colonial architecture style.

The entrance area is octagonal space with a dome on top of it. The building is ornamented with chhajjas, brackets and jalis which Batley considered "practical climatic essentials" and rooted in the traditional Indian architecture.

== See also ==
- Ahmedabad Town Hall
- Vijali Ghar
