= Tagore Memorial Hall =

Auditorium in Ahmedabad, India

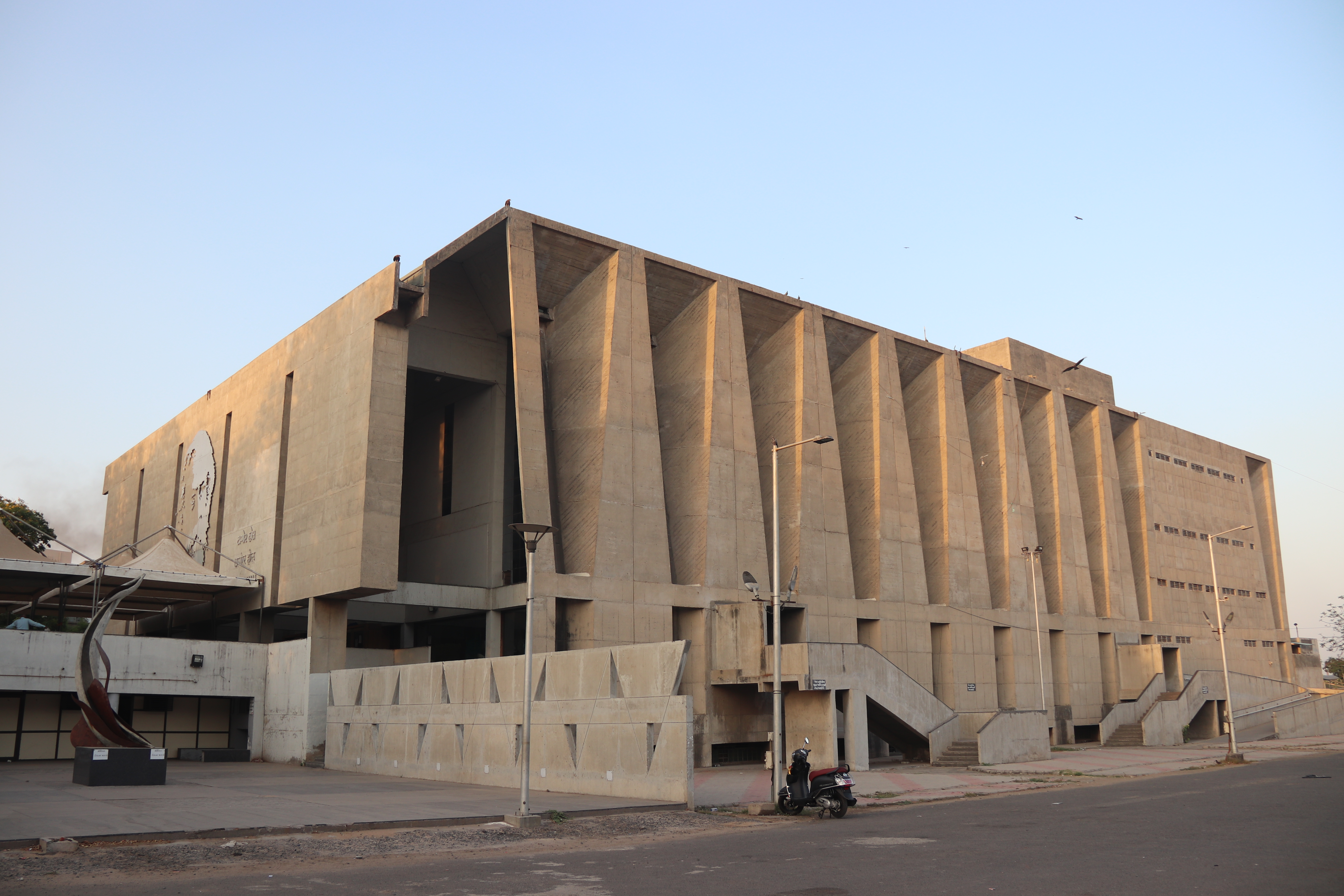
- From southwest corner
- Interactive map of the Tagore Memorial Hall area
- Alternative names: Tagore Hall
- Etymology: Rabindranath Tagore

General information
- Type: Auditorium
- Architectural style: Brutalist architecture
- Location: Opposite Sanskar Kendra, Paldi, Ahmedabad, India
- Coordinates: 23.0129°N 72.5711°E
- Construction started: 1966
- Completed: 1971
- Renovated: 2013
- Renovation cost: ₹11 crore (US$1.1 million)
- Client: Amdavad Municipal Corporation
- Owner: Amdavad Municipal Corporation

Technical details
- Material: Concrete
- Floor count: Four

Design and construction
- Architect: B. V. Doshi
- Architecture firm: Vastu Shilpa Consultants
- Structural engineer: Mahendra Raj

Tagore Memorial Hall, also known as Tagore Hall, is an auditorium in Ahmedabad, India. It is designed by B. V. Doshi in 1961. It is an example of brutalist architecture. Construction started in 1966 and was completed in 1971. It was renovated in 2013.

== History ==
Le Corbusier had designed the Sanskar Kendra as a part of the cultural centre of Ahmedabad, and had proposed two other buildings for performing arts which he had termed the "box of miracles" for professional artists and the "spontaneous theatre" for amateur artists. They were never built. In the 1960s, Ahmedabad Municipal Corporation commissioned B. V. Doshi to design the hall dedicated to Rabindranath Tagore at the same site. He completed the design in 1961. The hall was built from 1966 to 1971 under Mahendra Raj, a structural engineer.

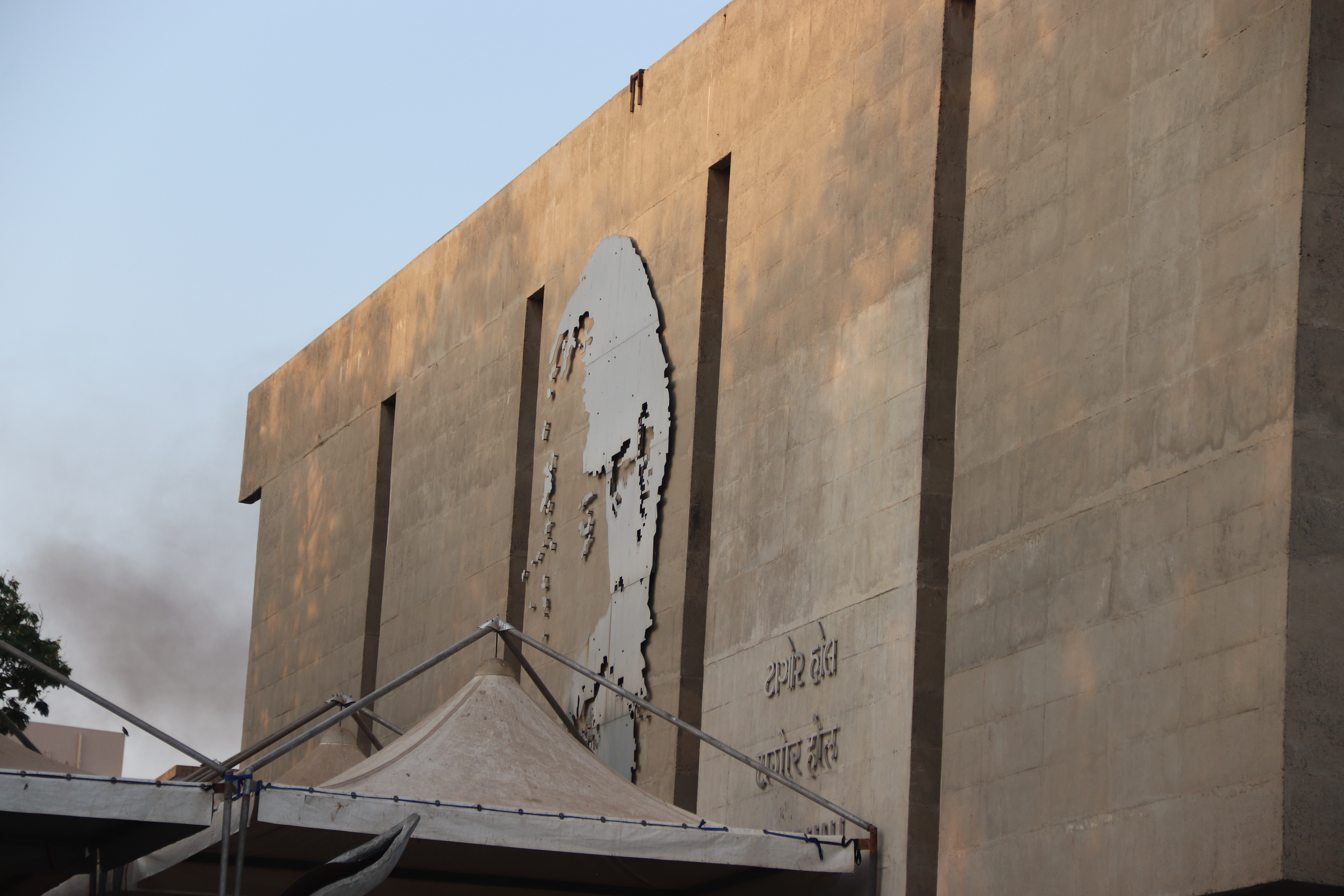
Stainless steel portrait of Tagore on the entrance facade

The hall was renovated with a new interior, in addition to a light and sound system, in 2013 at the cost of ₹11 crore (equivalent to ₹19 crore or US$2.0 million in 2023). A 12-by-24-foot (3.7 m × 7.3 m) stainless steel portrait of Rabindranath Tagore with his Bengali signature was added on the entrance facade. It was reopened on 25 November 2013 by Gujarat Chief Minister Anandiben Patel.

== Architecture ==
The Tagore Hall is an example of brutalist architecture. Doshi, inspired by Le Corbusier's buildings at Chandigarh and the "Box of Miracles" proposed by him, decided to use concrete to form the box-shaped exterior of the hall. On the north and south concrete walls of the building there are a series of rigid triangular folds along the foyer and auditorium. These structural as well as decorative folds form a 17m high and 33m wide outer shell of the building. These folds are followed by flat surfaces with a series of windows which make a box-shaped backstage and stage area. It is followed by a last triangular fold at the corner of the building which has an exterior staircase on the south corner inspired by the Mill Owners' Association Building.

The east and west facades are simple concrete grids filled with concrete panels. The perforated curtain-like entrance facade on the west joins the south and north folded walls forming a porch. Entering the porch, in the foyer, the sculptural columns and cantilevers supporting the auditorium are visible. The auditorium with a capacity of 700 people is supported by an independent structure.

== See also ==
- List of Brutalist structures
- Ahmedabad Town Hall
- Sanskar Kendra
