= Ahmedabad Town Hall =

Former auditorium in Ahmedabad, India

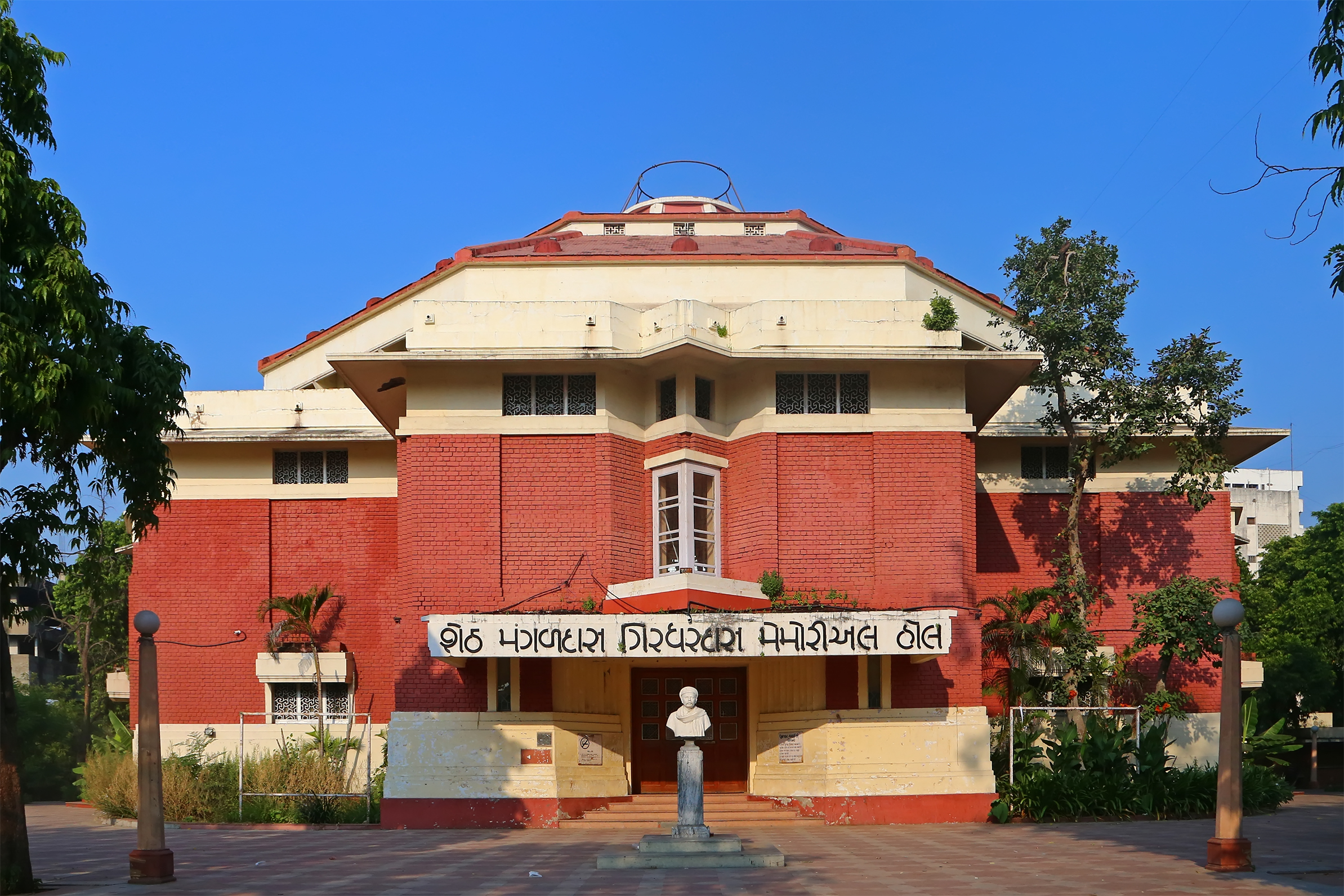
- Ahmedabad Town Hall, in 2014
- Interactive map of the Ahmedabad Town Hall area
- Alternative names: Sheth Mangaldas Girdhardas Memorial Hall

General information
- Type: Auditorium
- Architectural style: Art Deco with inspirations from Gujarati Hindu temples
- Location: Near Ellisbridge, Ahmedabad, India
- Coordinates: 23.02269°N 72.57081°E
- Construction started: 1936
- Estimated completion: 1938
- Renovated: 1960s, 1997-98
- Owner: Amdavad Municipal Corporation

Technical details
- Material: Brick Wall, Concrete Dome
- Floor count: 2

Design and construction
- Architect: Claude Batley

Renovating team
- Architect: Kamal Mangaldas
- Structural engineer: Devendra Shah

The Ahmedabad Town Hall, officially Sheth Mangaldas Girdhardas Memorial Hall, is an auditorium in Ahmedabad, India. It is named after Mangaldas Girdhardas, a textile industrialist. Built in 1930s and renovated twice, it is now abandoned.

== History ==
The town hall was constructed in 1930s as a memorial to Mangaldas Girdhardas, a noted textile industrialist in the 20th century, with funds donated by the citizens. It is owned by the Ahmedabad Municipal Corporation.

It was renovated in the 1960s under B. V. Doshi. He had opted for a false ceiling for better acoustics.

Extensive renovation was carried out in 1997–98 under architect Kamal Mangaldas, a grandson of Mangaldas Girdhardas. He removed the false ceiling and added a podium around the original building.

It is abandoned now.

== Architecture ==
The town hall was designed by British architect Claude Batley in 1939, who also designed the M. J. Library next to it.

It is an example of an Art Deco building. The plan of the building is designed by using two rotating squares placed at 45 degrees forming a star-shape. The resulting octagonal space is designed as a seating area. Rectangles are added to the front and rear of the central square which formed a vestibule and a stage respectively. The star-shaped building is capped by a dome on an octagonal space. The whole plan takes inspiration from the mandapas of Gujarati Hindu temples. The exterior has exposed bricks with stepped back corners invoking the complex exterior of Hindu temples.

The thick walls were constructed from bricks and an octagonal concrete dome was constructed over it. The Chhajja and ornate grills in the structure show influence of Gujarati architectural heritage.

== See also ==
- Tagore Memorial Hall
- Premabhai Hall
- Vijali Ghar
