= Sanskar Kendra =

- કર્ણાવતી : અતીતની ઝાંખી
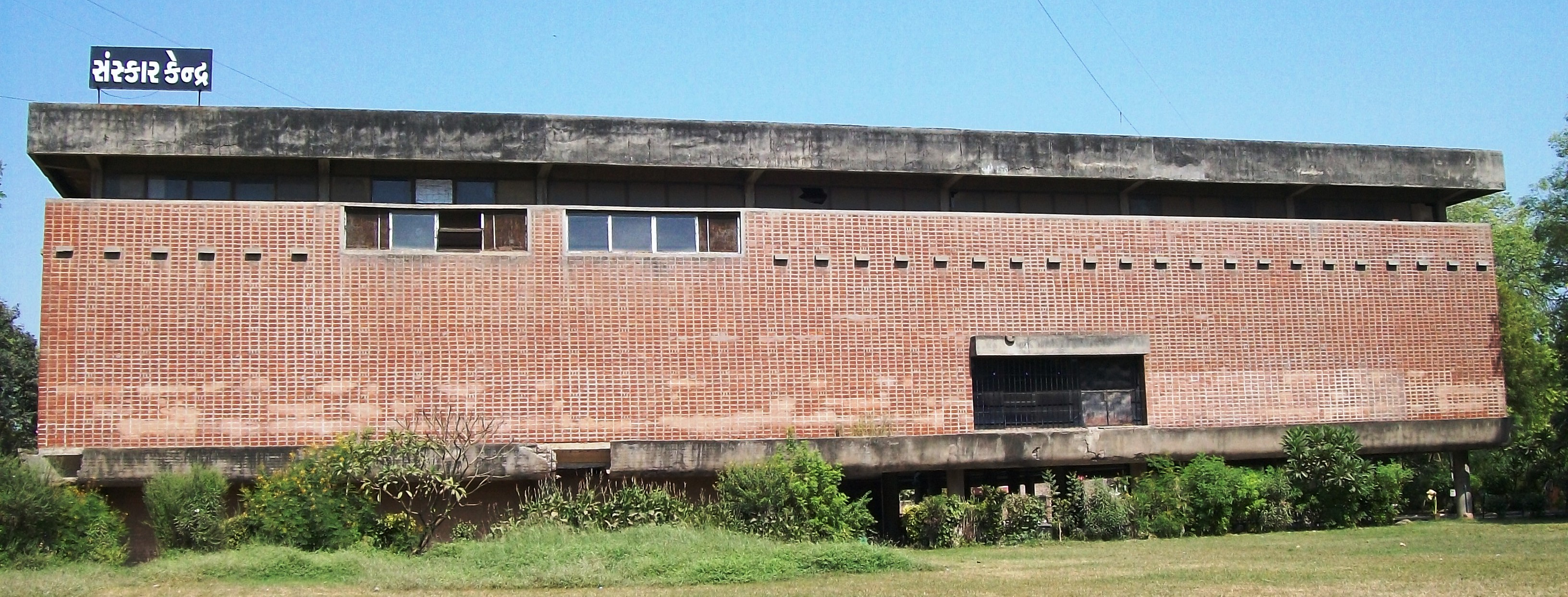
- Sanskar Kendra City Museum

- Location of Sanskar Kendra in Ahmedabad, Gujarat, India Sanskar Kendra (Gujarat) Sanskar Kendra (India)
- Established: 9 April 1954
- Location: Opp. Tagore Hall, near NID, Sardar bridge corner, Paldi, Ahmedabad
- Coordinates: 23°00′47″N 72°34′10″E
- Type: Local museum, history museum, art Museum, kite museum
- Owner: Ahmedabad Municipal Corporation

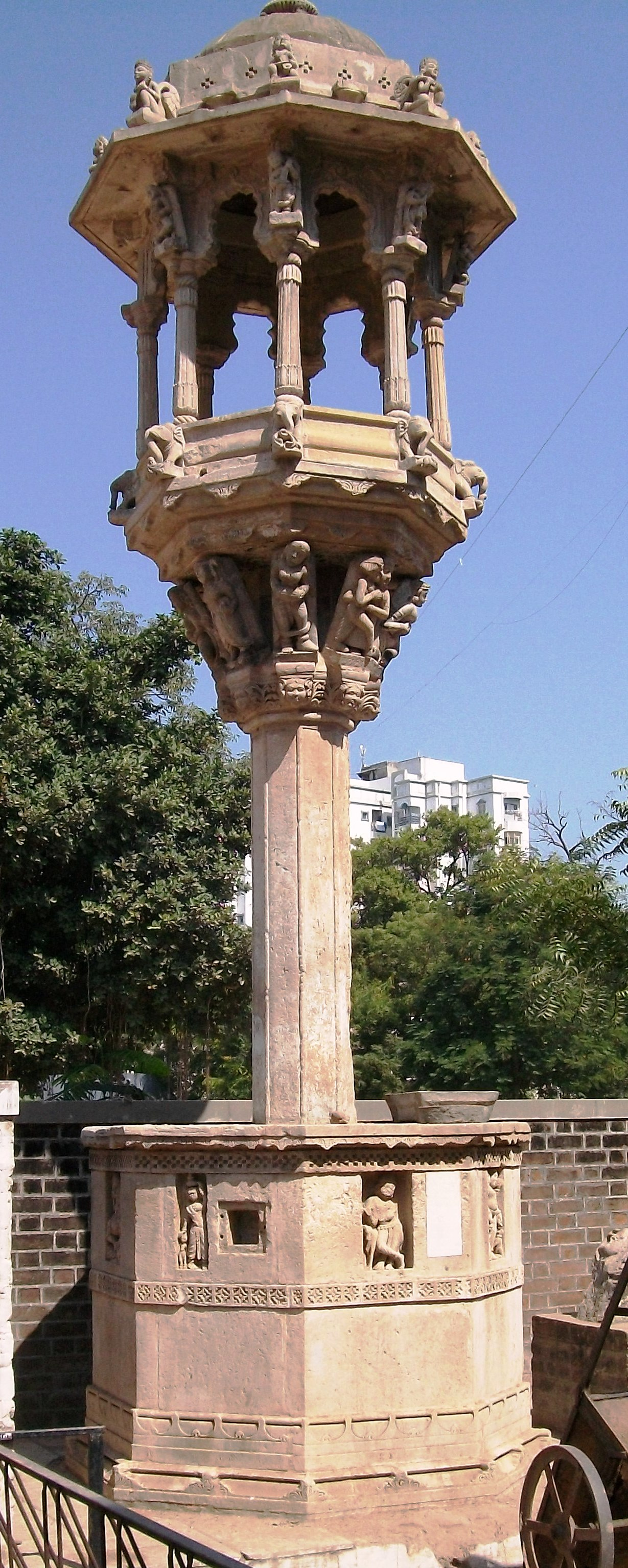
Chabutaro (bird feeding pole) at Sanskar Kendra, Ahmedabad, India. It is 120 years old and was originally in Kshetrapal ni Pol.

Sanskar Kendra is a museum at Ahmedabad, India, designed by the architect Le Corbusier. It is a city museum depicting history, art, culture and architecture of Ahmedabad. Another Patang Kite Museum is there which includes a collection of kites, photographs, and other artifacts. The campus is located at the west end of Sardar Bridge near Paldi.

== History ==
The museum was designed in the Modernist style by the Swiss-French architect Le Corbusier. It was named Museum of Knowledge during designing. It was originally a part of a large complex of Cultural Centre of Ahmedabad which had separate pavilions and areas for different subjects like anthropology, natural history, archaeology, monumental sculptures, workshops and depots, folklores in open air. It also included a pavilion for theatre called miracle box. But out of whole planned cultural centre, only museum was built. Its foundation stone was laid on 9 April 1954.

The museum was closed in March 2020 following the COVID-19 pandemic. It was kept closed for renovation since.

== Modernist architecture ==
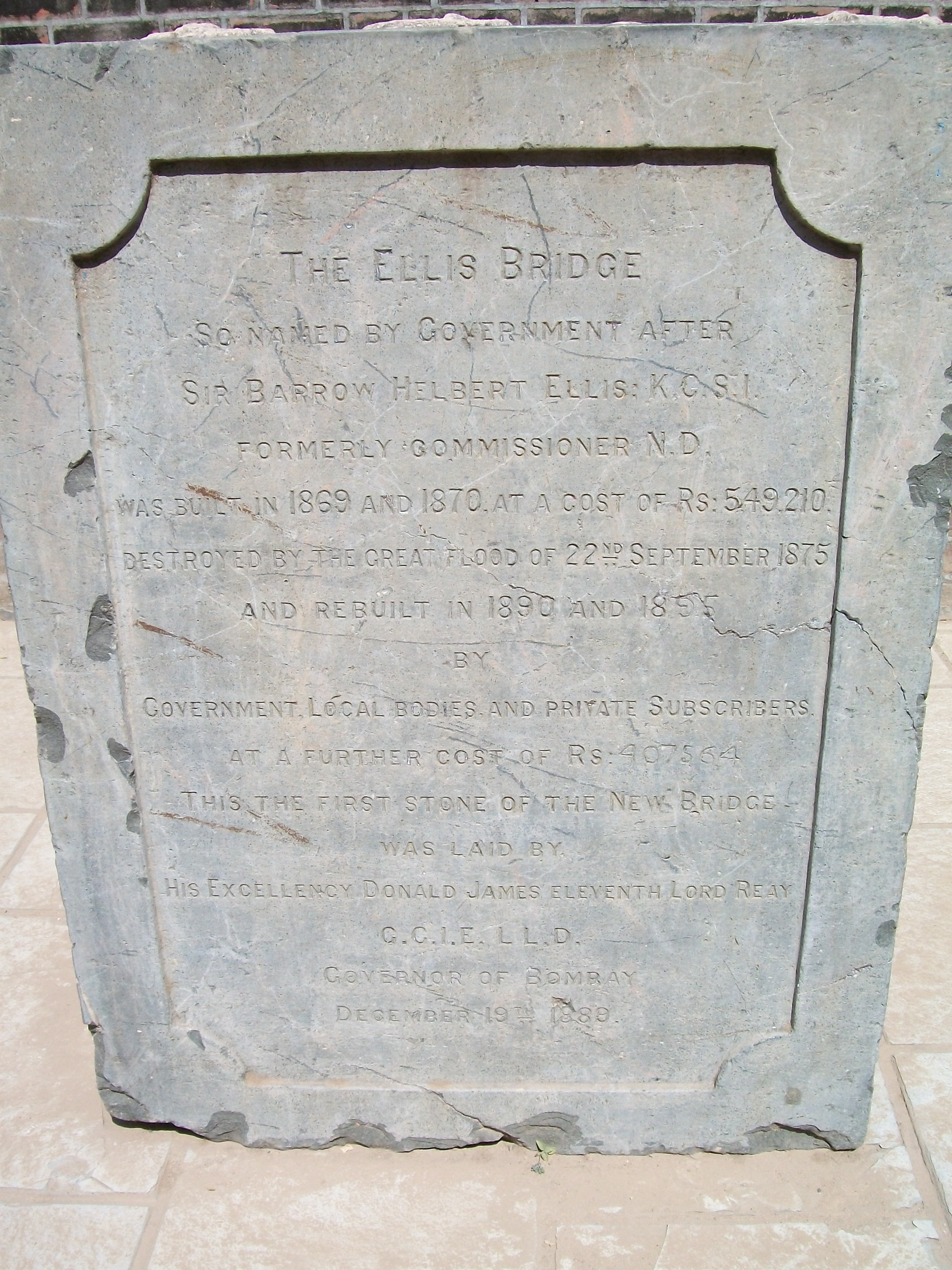
Foundation Block of Ellisbridge. Now at Sanskar Kendra.

It rests on his signature pilotis, that are 3.4 metres (11 ft) high there. The building's exterior is of plain brick with exposed elements of raw concrete (Béton brut) structure. The structural grid is 7 metres (23 ft).

The building is designed to protect against the hot climate. On the roof there are several large basins originally intended as planters. One enters from underneath the building where there is an open court with a large pool and a ramp that leads to the exhibition spaces. The interior spaces are finished in plaster.

The museum is similar to other museum projects by Le Corbusier, such as the "Museum of unlimited extension" project, the National Museum of Western Art in Tokyo, and the Government Museum and Art Gallery in Chandigarh, in that the plan is based on a spiral and is designed to be expanded.

== Collections ==
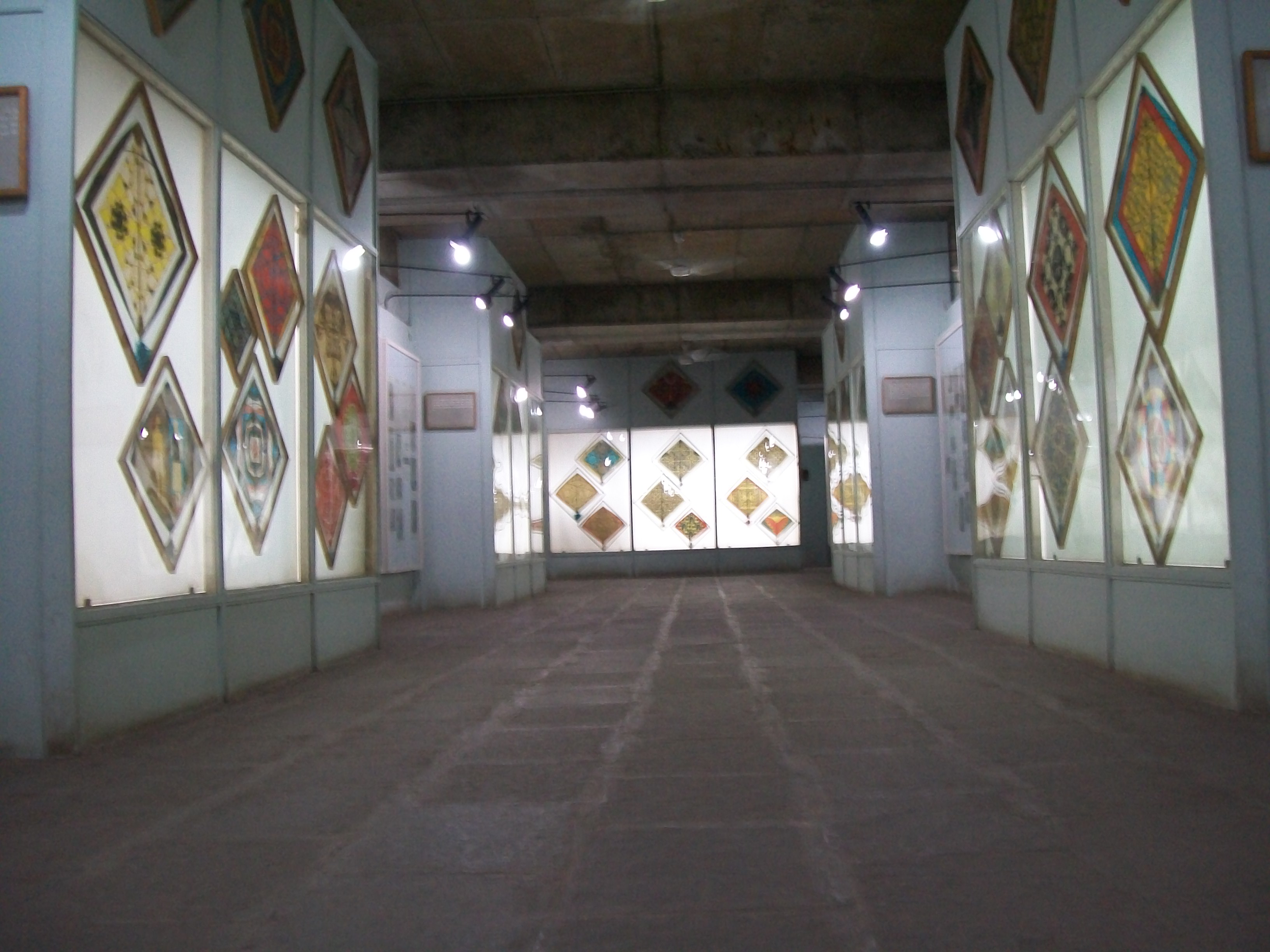
Kite Museum

Museum have various sections related to history of city, art, photography, Mahatma Gandhi, Indian independence struggle, various religious communities of Ahmedabad. It houses the tallest incense stick of the world of 4.5 m. The building includes a Kite Museum, which includes a collection of kites, photographs, and other artifacts.

Foundation block of Ellis Bridge was moved to Sanskar Kendra. It reads:

"The Ellis Bridge - So named by Government after Sir Barrow Helbert Ellis : K.G.S.I. was built in 1869 and 1870. At a cost of Rs:549,210 destroyed by the great flood of 22nd September 1875 and rebuilt in 1890 and 1895 by Government, Local Bodies and Private Subscribers. At a further cost of Rs. 407564. This the First Stone of the new bridge was laid by His Excellency Donald James eleventh Lord Reay C.C.I.E.LL.D. Governor of Bombay December 19th, 1889."

== Photo gallery ==
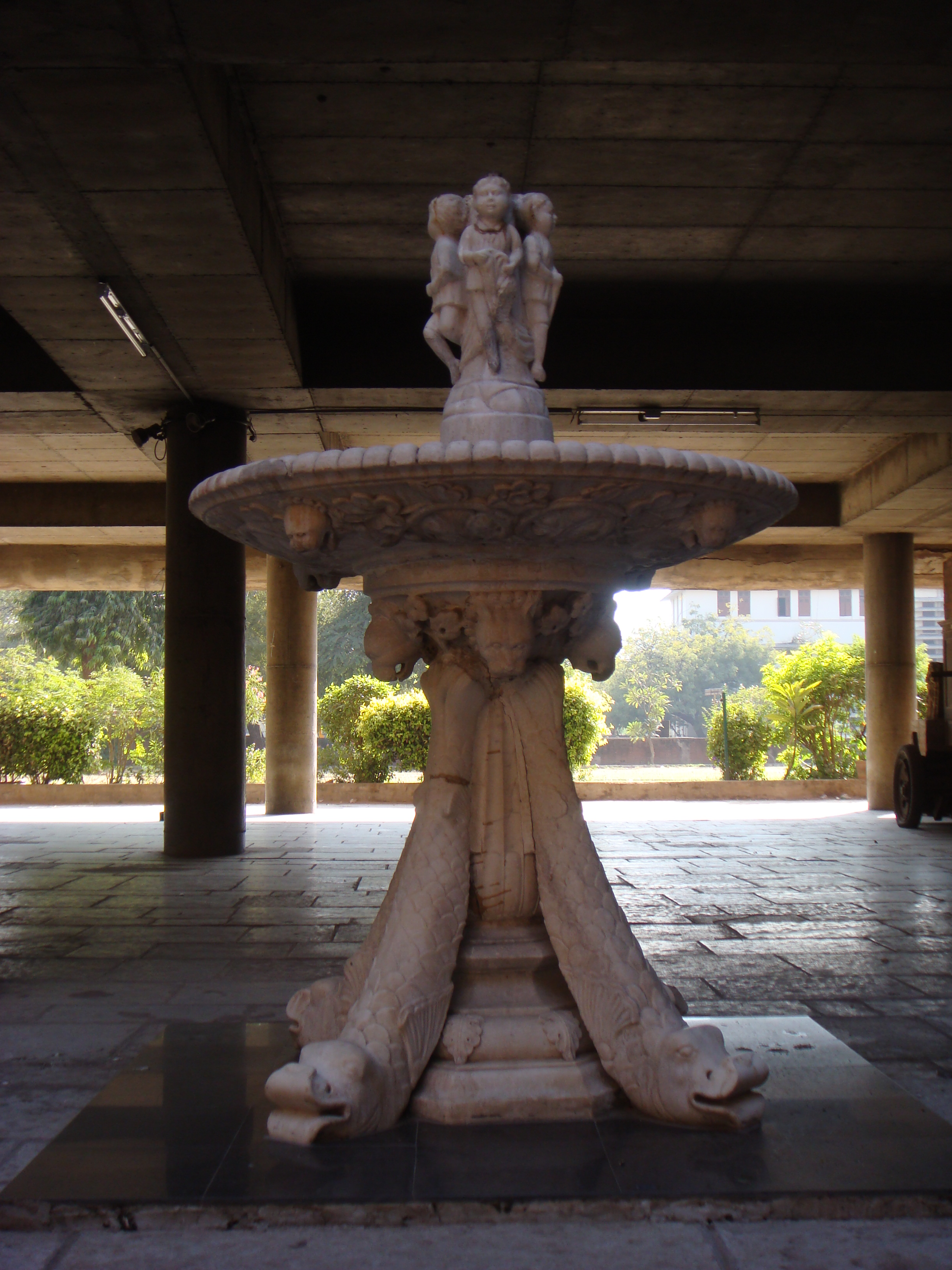
Museum on pilotis, and item displayed.

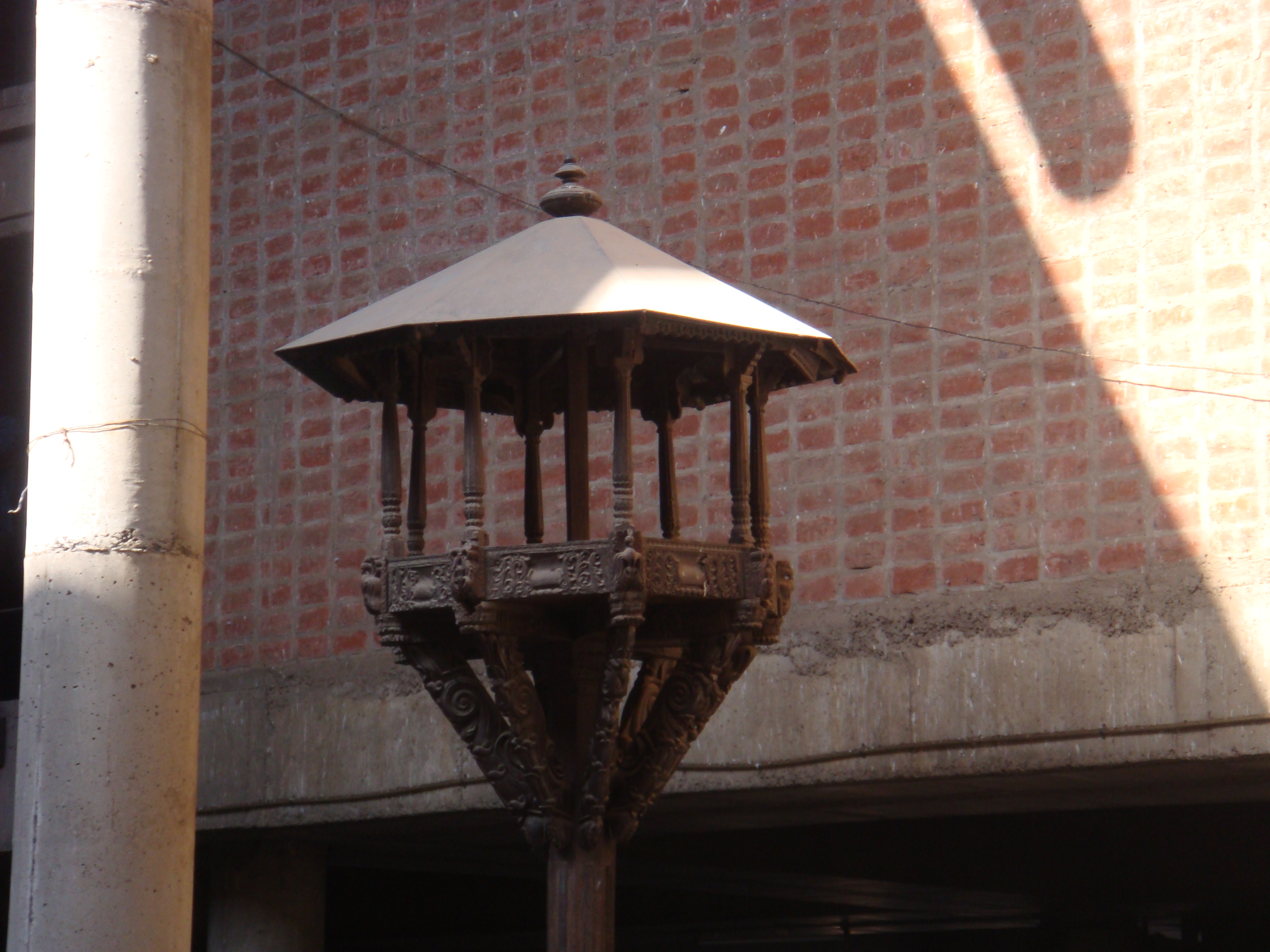
Chabutra and brick walls.

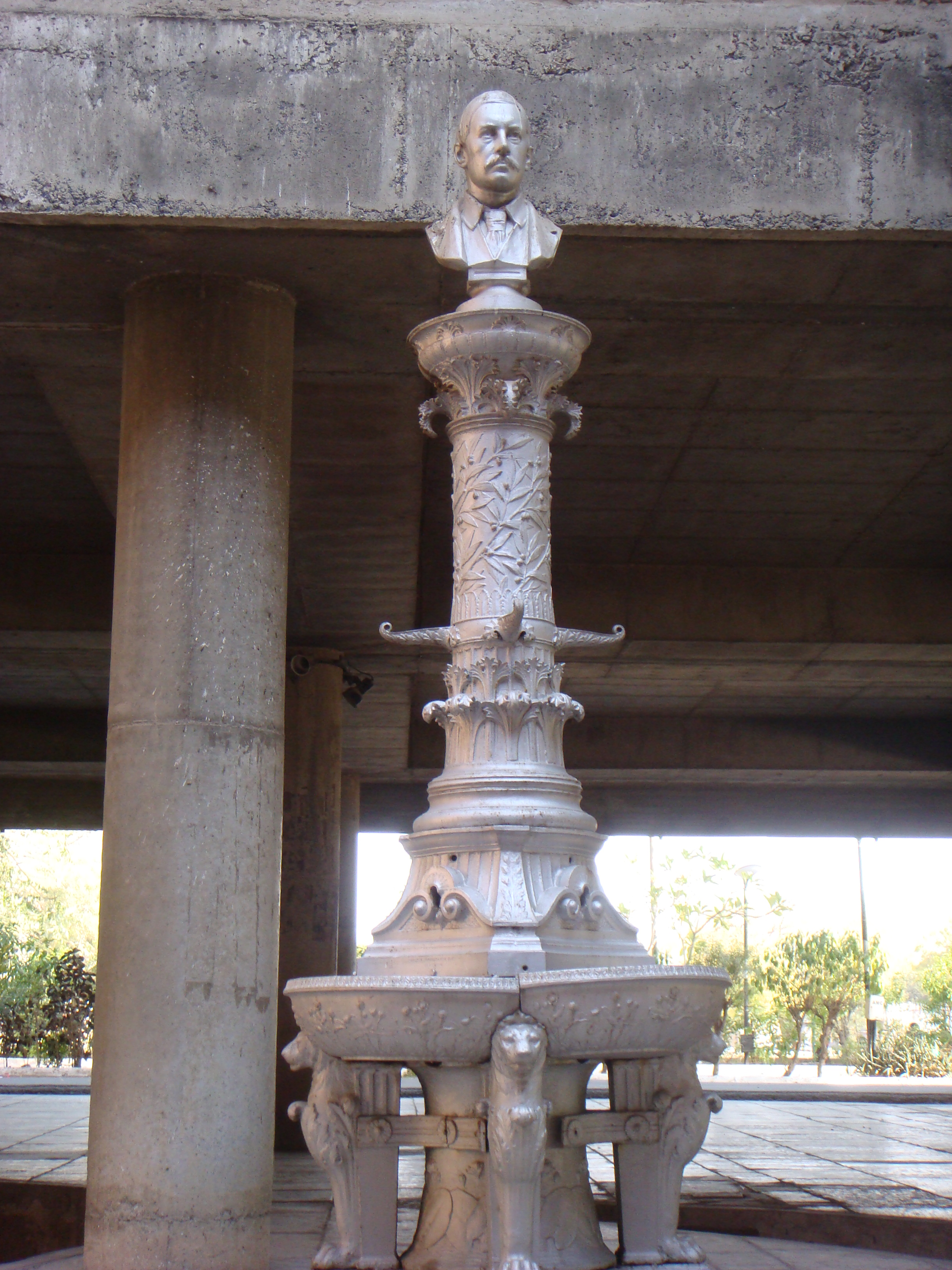
Fountain; was originally at Fuwara, Kalupur.

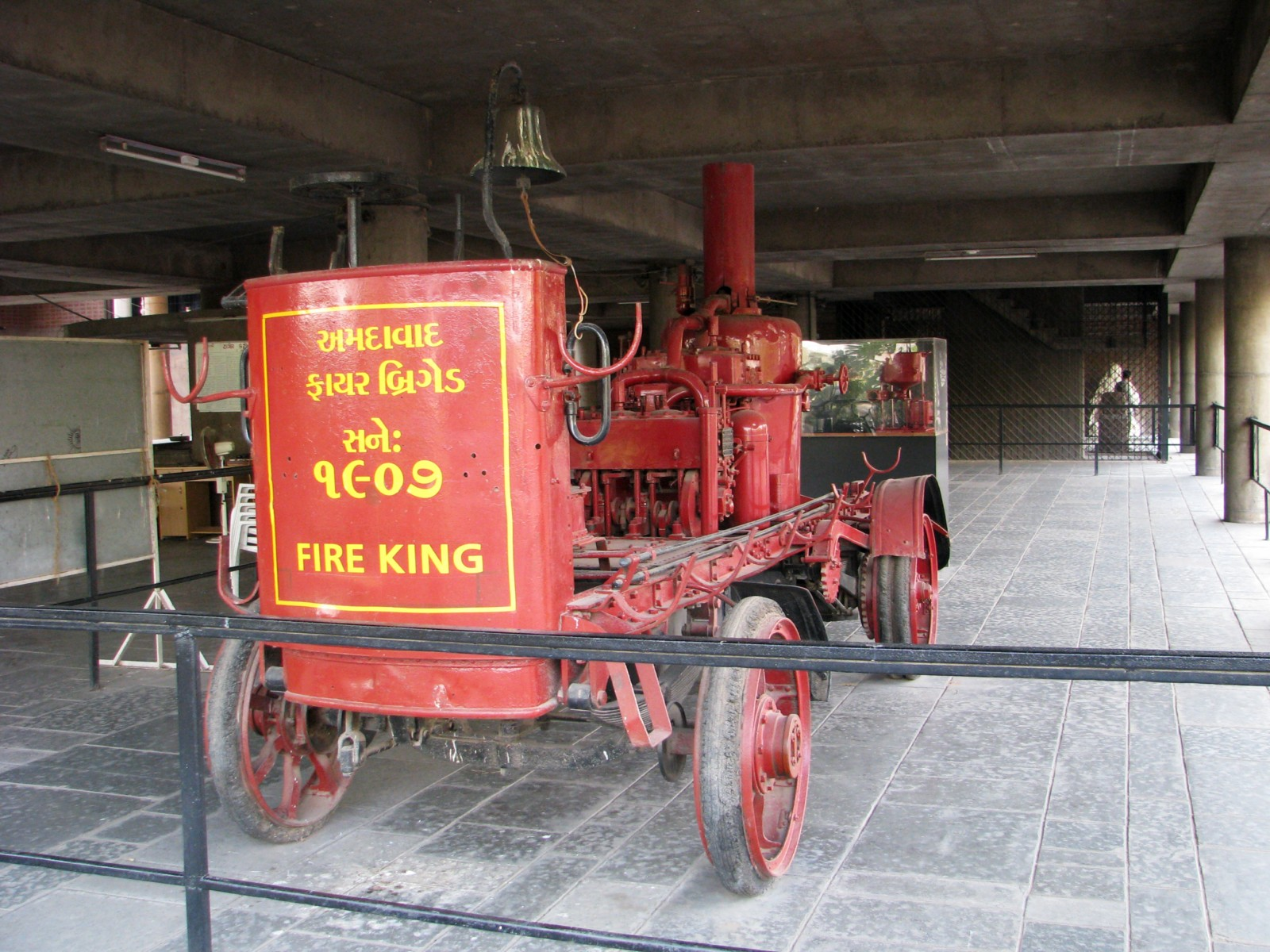
Ahmedabad Fire brigade 1907

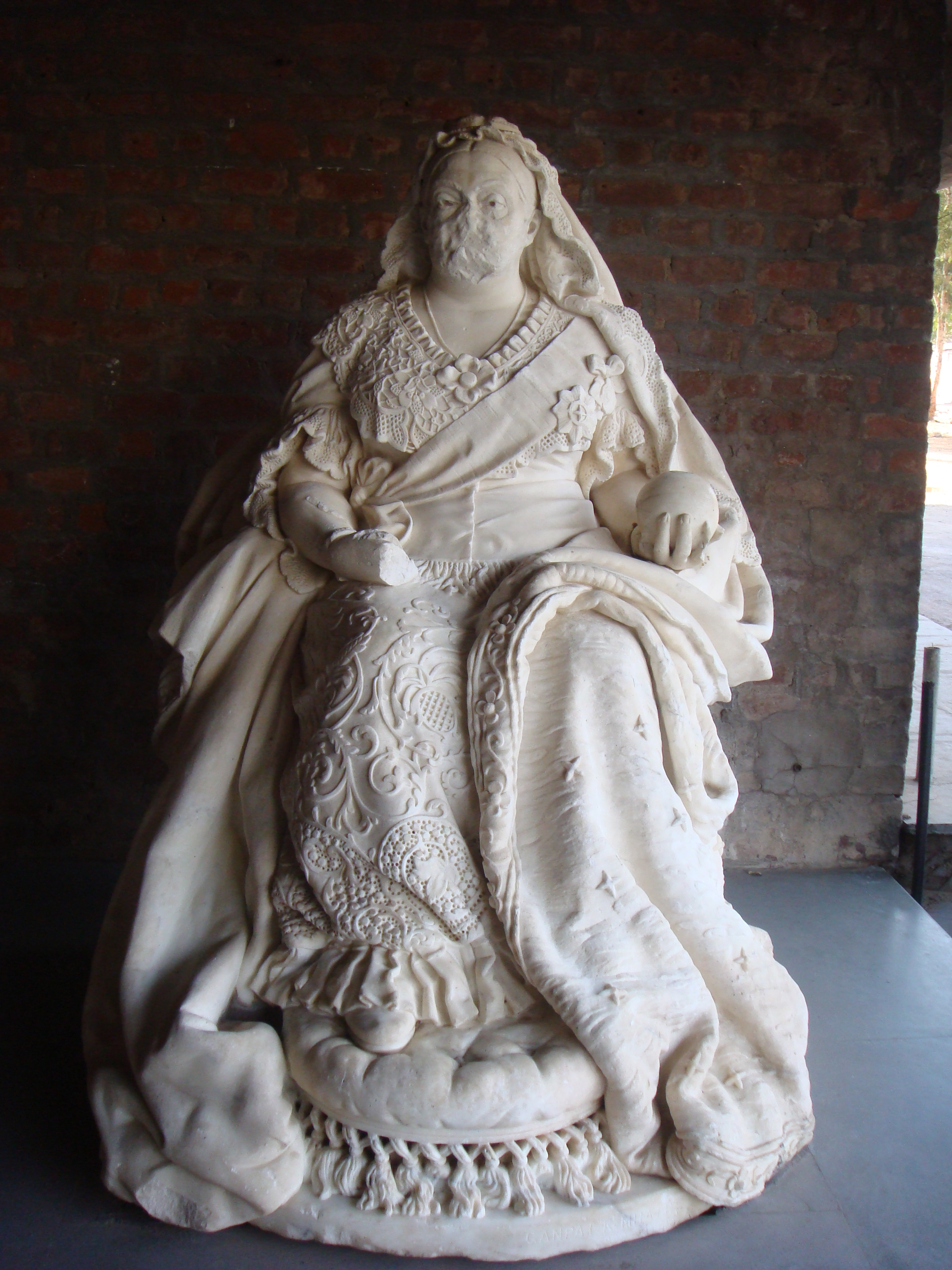
Queen Victoria statue

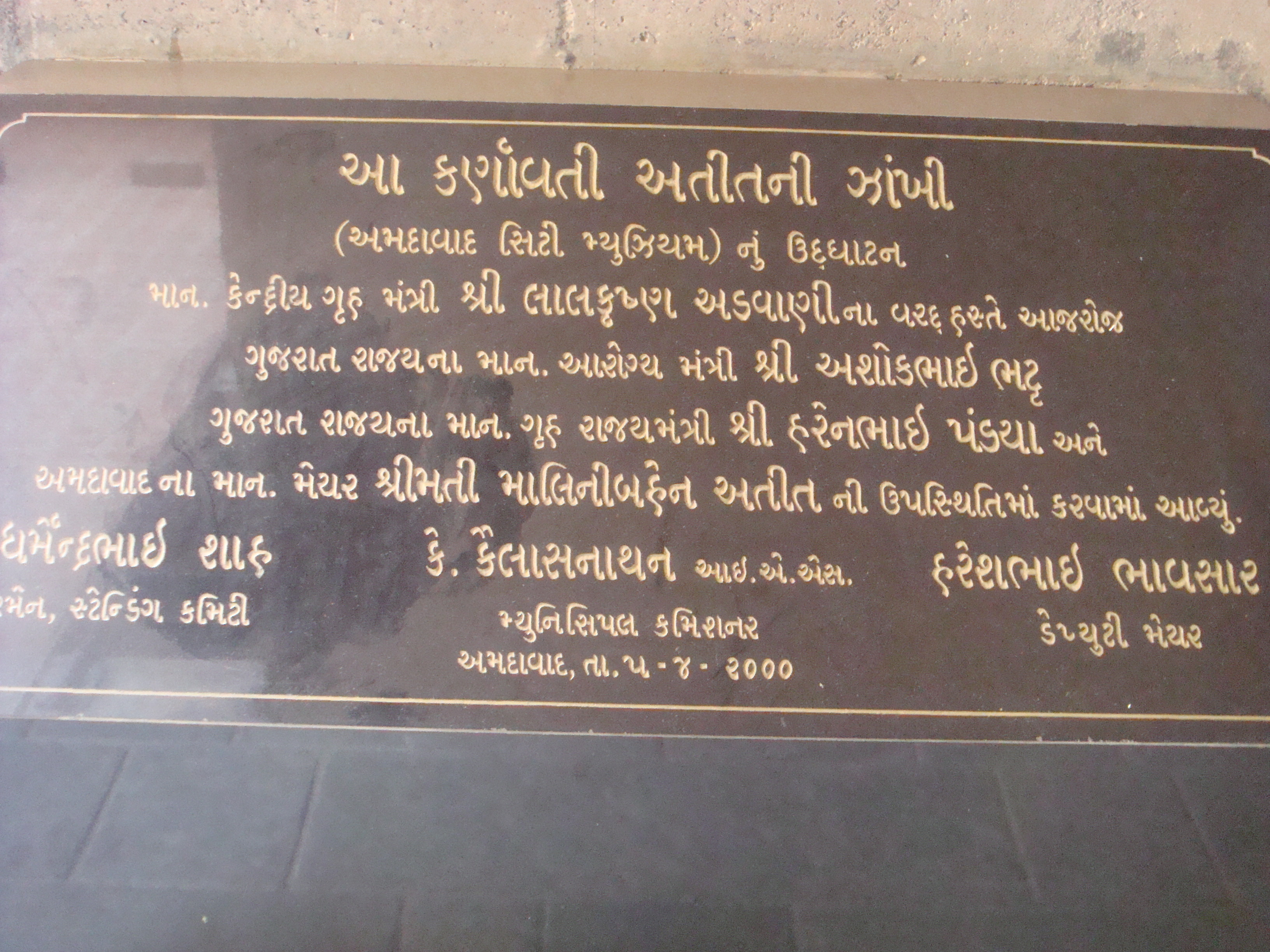
Re-inauguration Plaque

== See also ==
- Tagore Memorial Hall
- List of Le Corbusier buildings
- Index: Modernist architecture in India
- Ellis Bridge
