= Mill Owners' Association Building =

Mill Owner's Building
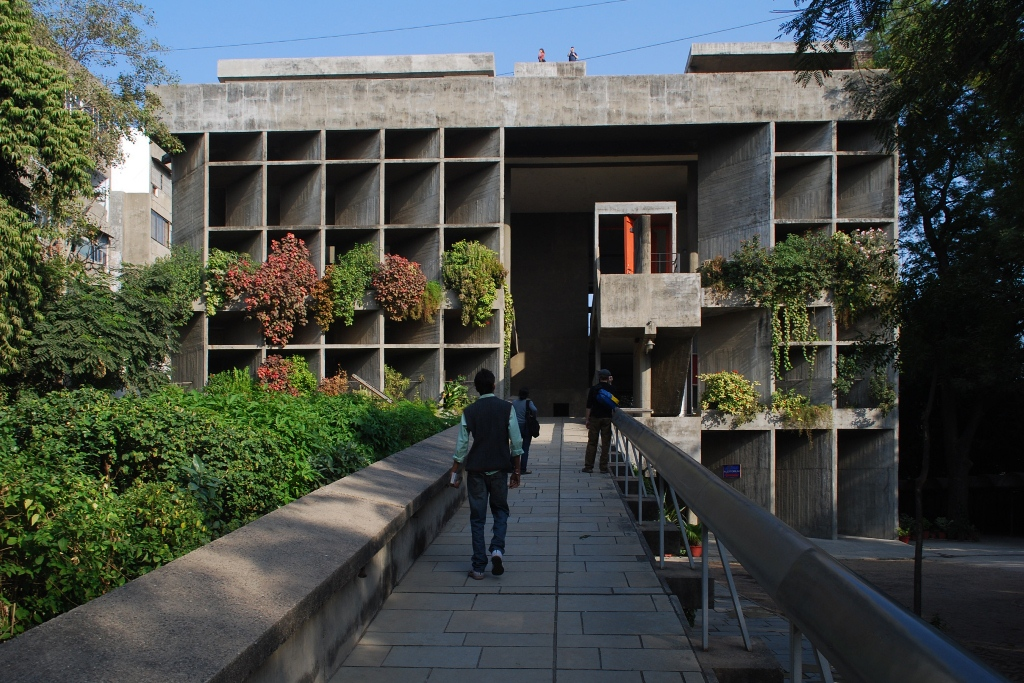
- Mill Owner's Building
- Interactive map of the Mill Owner's Building area
- Alternative names: ATMA / Ahmedabad Textile Mills Association / Mill Owners Association

General information
- Architectural style: Modern
- Location: Near Natraj Cinema, Ashram Road, Navrangpura, Ahmedabad, India
- Coordinates: 23°1′57″N 72°34′15″E
- Completed: 1954
- Client: Ahmedabad Textile Mills Association
- Owner: Ahmedabad Textile Mills Association

Design and construction
- Architect: Le Corbusier

Website
- https://www.atmaahmedabad.com

Mill Owner's Building, also known as Mill Owner's Association or Ahmedabad Textile Mills Association (ATMA), is a modern architecture building in Ahmedabad, India designed by Swiss-French architect Le Corbusier.

== History ==
In 1891, the Mill Owners' Association (ATMA) was formed in Ahmedabad, with Ranchhodlal Chhotalal as its founder president. Anasuya Sarabhai, sister of Ambalal Sarabhai, served as its President. She played a key role in Mahatma Gandhi-led Champaran Satyagraha.

Le Corbusier came to India to design Chandigarh in 1951. He was invited to Ahmedabad by mayor Chinubhai Chimanbhai. Surottam Hutheesing, then president of Ahmedabad Mill Owners' Association, commissioned Corbusier to build the new headquarters of the association. It was completed in 1954.

== Design ==
A ceremonial ramp makes for a grand approach into a triple height entrance hall, open to the wind. Arrival is on the first floor, where (as per the original design) the executives' offices and boardroom are located. The ground floor houses the work-spaces of the clerks and a separate, single-story canteen at the rear.

On the third floor is a high, top-lit auditorium with a roof canopy and a curved, enclosing wall, in addition to a generous lobby. The east and west façades are in the form of sun breakers or brise-soleil, one of Corbusier's many formal inventions, which, while avoiding harsh sun, permit visual connection and air movement. While the brise-soleil act as free façades made of rough shuttered concrete, the north and south sides, built in rough brickwork, are almost unbroken.

On the second floor of the Mill Owners' Building, the lobby is treated as "an open space defined by harsh, angular forms and the auditorium as an enclosed space delineated by soft, curvilinear forms …two contradictory elements that both need the other in order to exist."

== Philosophy ==
In designing the office, Le Corbusier understood the essence of the Association very well. Since 1891, AMOA had provided an institutional framework for the close family ties of the city's largely Jain, textile mill owners. Corbusier expressed the institution's dual character - the public and the private - through his concept of the house as a palace (Une maison - un palais). Villa Cook, designed by him in 1926 and based on this same concept, is considered to be the closest antecedent of the Mill Owners' Building. Conversely, many of his later projects, most notably the Carpenter Center for the Visual Arts at Harvard, benefited from some of the experiments carried out in this particular building.
