= Arpan Shah =

Indian architect (1975)

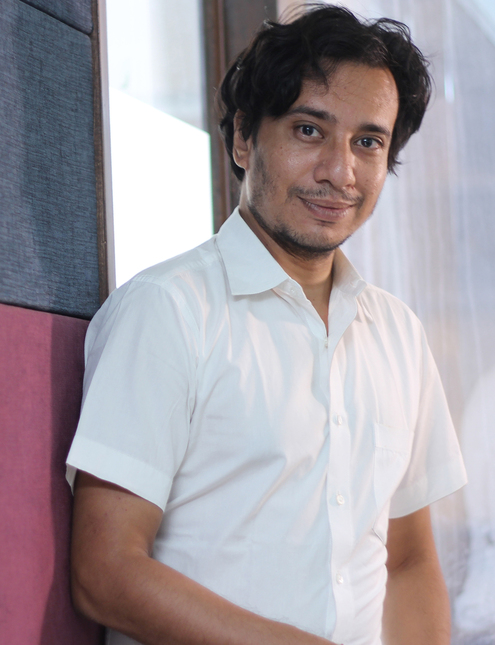
- Shah in 2017
- Born: Arpan Deepak Shah; 21 January 1975; Mumbai, India
- Education: St. Xavier's High School, Loyola Hall, Ahmedabad, CEPT - School of Architecture
- Occupation: Architect
- Spouse: Rajal Mehta Shah (m. 2010)
- Website: mododesigns.co.in

Arpan Shah (21 January 1975) is an Indian architect. He is an alumnus of CEPT - School of Architecture

He has worked under B. V. Doshi, at his Ahmedabad office between 1999 and 2000, Following which he grew to open his own firm Modo Designs in 2002. His works have been recipients of multiple awards.

== Personal life and career ==
Arpan Shah was born in Mumbai, and grew up in Ahmedabad to parents Deepak and Varsha Shah.

He was schooled at St. Xavier's High School, Loyola Hall, Ahmedabad, following which he completed his Architectural studies from CEPT - School of Architecture, along with an exchange study in RMIT, Melbourne. His formative days at CEPT - School of Architecture were an architectural education under notable teachers including B. V. Doshi, Anant Raje and Kurula Varkey.

Arpan Shah married Rajal Mehta Shah in 2010, and has two children, Ameya and Reya.

== Style ==
Arpan Shah's intent has been to see design as a participatory and an exploratory process, involving research, explorations and refinement. The essential approach has been to develop architectural designs as responsive and which are characteristic of the purpose, place and people.

== Famous works ==
- Interpretation center, Taranga Hills - Anandji Kalyanji Jain Trust
- Symphony corporate house - Achal Bakeri, Symphony Limited
- Symphony Forest Park - Symphony Limited & Amdavad Municipal Corporation
- Torrent cables office - Torrent Cables
- Bodyshine Essentials Unit - Abhay Mangaldas (Sarabhai family) - House of MG
- SS outhouse - Vikram I. Shah,Shalby hospitals
- Studio Retreat - Sambhaav
- Designer's abode - Shyamal & Bhumika Shodhan
- The House of Courtyards - Utkarsh Shah - Adi Heritage group
- The Verandah house - Munshaw family
- The House by the trees - Patel family
- The Elemental house - Vadodaria family
- The Inside out house - Nimbark family
- The Terra cotta house - Dalal family
- Sun Evoq - Sun Group
- Altius vibe - Synthesis Spacelinks

== Awards ==
- AD100 (Architectural Digest, India)- The most influential designers in the subcontinent', 2018
- Best of Houzz 2018 award in 'design category'
- NDTV Design and Architecture Award 2016 (category - house award for hot and dry climatic zone)
- Kohler Co. Bold Design Award 2016 ( category - Bold Luxury)
- Asian Paints ID Honours (India Design 2019) - Holiday Homes category
