= Patanga =

Patanga may refer to:

- Patanga (grasshopper), a genus of grasshoppers in the subfamily Cyrtacanthacridinae
- Patanga (Penrhyn), an islet in Penrhyn Atoll, Cook Islands
- Patanga (1949 film), an Indian Hindi-language romantic comedy film
- Patanga (1971 film), an Indian Hindi-language drama film
- Patanga, a fictional city in the novel The Wizard of Lemuria

== See also ==
- Patang (disambiguation)
- Patang Hotel, Gujarat, India
