= Demographics and culture of Ahmedabad =

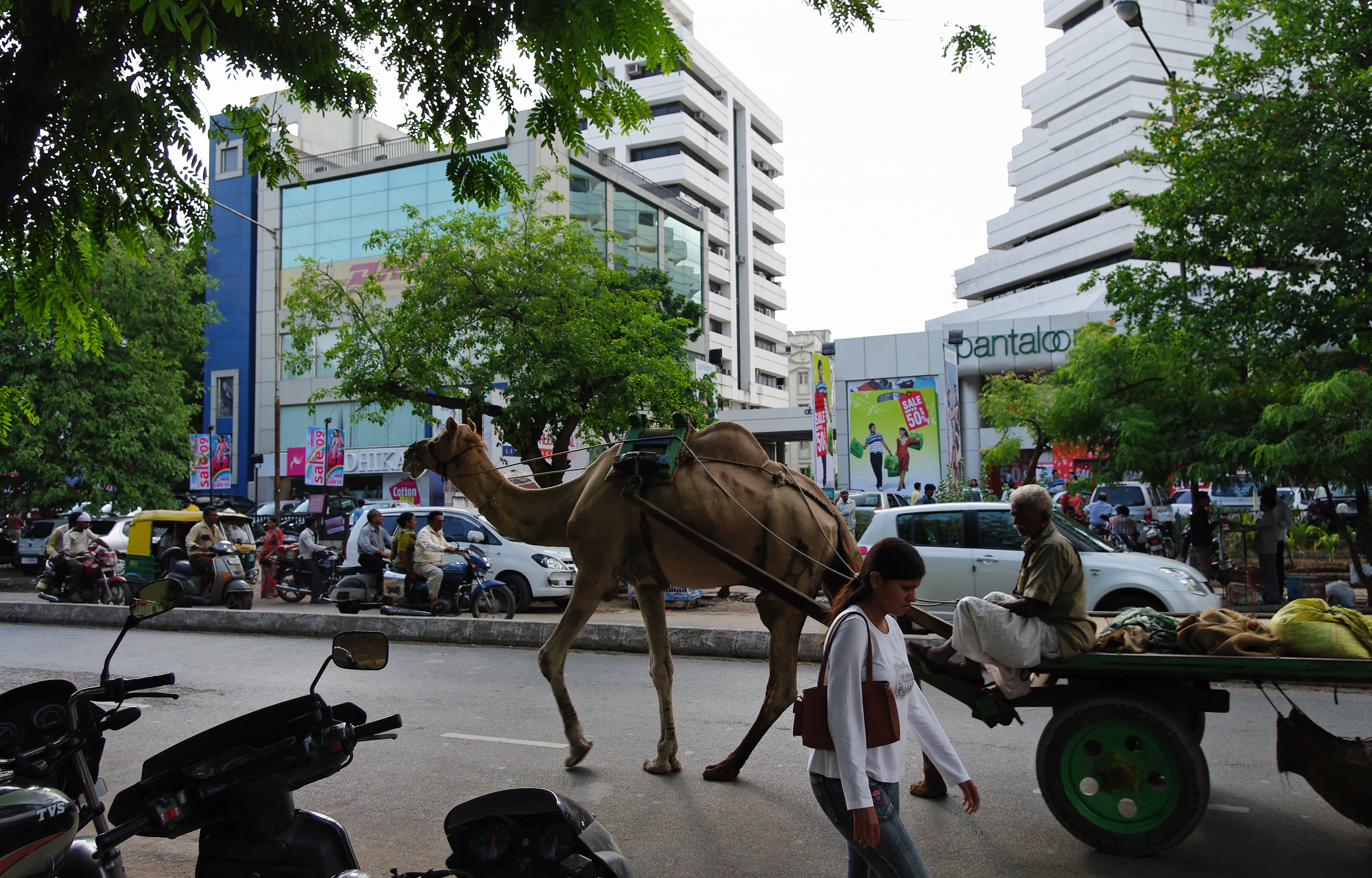
Mithakhali road near Law Garden

According to the 2011 national census, the population of Ahmedabad was declared to be 7,214,225. This figure was only limited to the municipality region. The total population of the Ahmedabad Urban Agglomeration (which also includes the region governed by AUDA) came to 7.2 million people. There were 886 females to every 1000 males in 2001. Now there are 904 women to 1000 men in 2011. Ahmedabad had a literacy rate of 79.89% in 2001 which rose to 89.62 percent in 2011. Out of this, male and female literacy are 93.96 and 84.81 percent as of 2011 census. According to the census for the ninth plan, there are 30737 rural families living in Ahmedabad. Out of those, 5.41% (1663 families) live below the poverty line. There are 439,843 people who live in slums in the city. The majority of residents of Ahmedabad are native Gujaratis and speak Gujarati. There is also a sizable population of Punjabis, Marathis, Tamils, Sindhis, Malayalis and Marwaris who bring in their native language and culture to the city. The government institutions and military base near the city also bring peoples from across India. The city's population has increased in a major way following increasing economic expansion and modernization.

Ahmedabad also enjoys great religious diversity. According to the 2011 census, 83% of the population in Ahmedabad is Hindu, 13.8% Muslim, 2.5% Jain and 0.72% Christian. The community of Muslims is large and culturally significant in Ahmedabad, dating from the times of the Sultanate. The city is also home to a major population of Parsis in India. There is also a small population of 300 Bene Israel Jews living in Ahmedabad. Owing to the religious and cultural influence of Jains and many Hindus, there is widespread vegetarianism across the city's hotels and restaurants.

== Culture ==
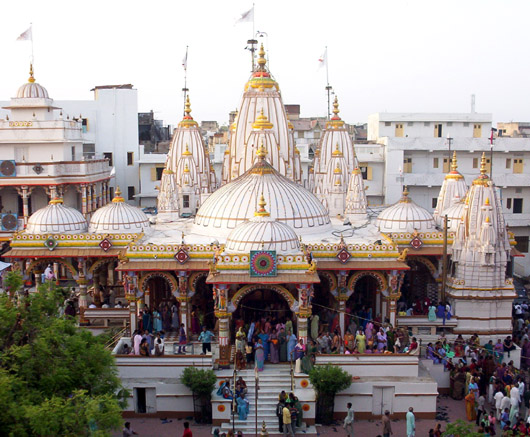
World's first Swaminarayan Temple was built in Ahmedabad by the instructions of Lord Swaminarayan.

Ahmedabad is known for its diverse cultural traditions and for the celebration of various festivals across religious and demographic communities.

Uttarayan is celebrated as a kite flying day on 14 January every year. The nine nights of Navaratri are celebrated in a traditional manner with people performing garba at pre-arranged venues, which is the folk dance of Gujarat. The festival of lights - Deepavali is celebrated with the lighting of lamps in every house, decorating the floors with the rangoli and bursting of fire-crackers. Other festivals like Holi, Raksha Bandhan, Eid ul-Fitr and Christmas are also celebrated with enthusiasm. The annual Rathyatra procession on the Ashadh-sud-bij date of the Hindu calendar and the procession of Tajia during Muharram are an integral part of the culture of the city.

Also the Hathee Singh Jain Temple built by Merchant Hathee Singh in 1850 AD serves as an example of the culture of the city of Ahmedabad. The temple is known for its architectural styling and designing that consists of intricate carvings.

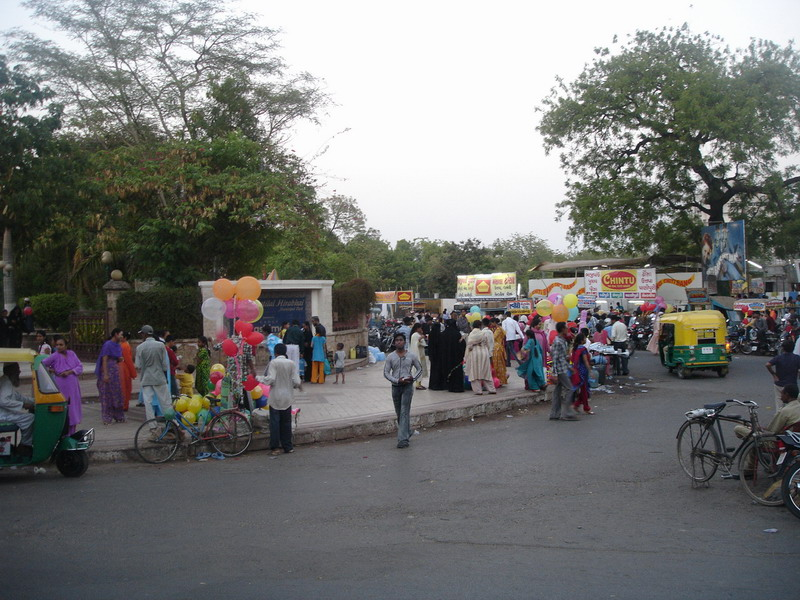
Road side food stalls - a common sight in Ahmedabad

People of the city are known for their love for food. A typical Gujarati thali (meal) consists of Roti, Dal, Rice and Shaak (cooked vegetable curry). There are a large number of restaurants which cater to people of all tastes and likes. The cuisine ranges from traditional Gujarati thalis to Punjabi, South Indian, Thai, Italian, Chinese and junk food. Most of the eating joints serve only vegetarian food as majority of the populace is vegetarian. Ahmedabad boasts of the first all-vegetarian Pizza Hut in the world Ahmedabad has a quite a few restaurants serving typical Mughlai non-vegetarian food in older areas like Bhatiyar Gali, Kalupur and Jamalpur. The old city is also known for good bakeries making Naan (Indian bread) and Nankhatai (Indian cookies). The architectural landscape of Ahmedabad stretches across the millennium. The architecture of the Sultanate period fused Hindu craftsmanship and forms with traditional Islamic layouts. These developments later gave rise to a fusion which is known as the Indo-Saracenic style. Many mosques in the city are built in this fashion. After independence modern buildings came up in Ahmedabad when renowned architects were given commissions in the city like Louis Kahn who designed the Indian Institute of Management; Le Corbusier who designed the Shodhan and Sarabhai Villas, the Sanskar Kendra and the Mill Owner's Association; and Buckminster Fuller who designed the Calico Dome. Balkrishna V. Doshi came to the city from Paris to supervise Le Corbusier's works and later set up the School of Architecture. His local masterpieces include Sangath, the Doshi-Hussain Gumpha and the School of Architecture. Charles Correa designed the Gandhi Ashram and Achut Kanvinde the Indian Textile Industries Research Association. Christopher Charles Benninger's first work, the Alliance Francaise (Ahmedabad), is located in the Ellis Bridge area. Hasmukh Patel, and his son Bimal Patel, are well known architects of the city having designed the St. Xavier's High School Loyola Hall, Gujarat High Court and the Ahmedabad Management Association.

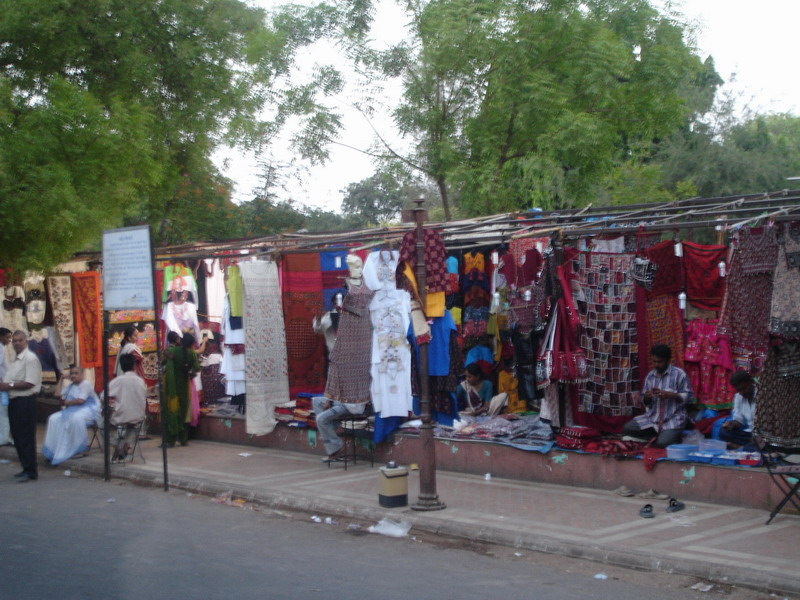
Traditional clothes called Chania Cholis being sold at Law Garden

Various parts of Ahmedabad are known for their speciality of folk art. The Paldi area is famous for embroidery from Kutch and Saurashtra region. Rangeela pol is famous for bandhinis (tie and dye work) while Madhupura is famous for its traditional mojri footwear. Ganesha idols are made in huge numbers in the Gulbai Tekra area. Law Garden is famous for its mirror work handicraft.

Many Gujarati littérateurs migrated to Ahmedabad due to its prosperity. Three literary institutions were started in Ahmedabad for the promotion of Gujarati literature - Gujarat Vidhya Sabha, Gujarati Sahitya Parishad and Gujarat Sahitya Sabha. Ahmedabad has many institutes which promoting classical music and dance. A famous event in the cultural calendar of Ahmedabad is an Indian classical music festival organized by the Saptak School of Music from 1 January every year where vocalists and instrumentalists from all over the world are invited to perform. The city has many museums. The Sanskar Kendra, one of the many buildings in Ahmedabad designed by the Le Corbusier, is a city museum depicting history, art, culture and architecture of Ahmedabad. The Gandhi Smarak Sangrahalaya and the Sardar Vallabhbhai Patel National Memorial have a permanent display of photographs, documents and other articles of Mahatma Gandhi and Sardar Patel respectively. The Calico Textile Museum has a large collection of Indian and international fabrics, garments and textiles. The Hazrat Pir Mohammad Shah Library has a collection of rare original manuscripts in Arabic, Persian, Urdu, Sindhi and Turkish languages.
