= Canna Patel =

Indian architect

Canna Hasmukh Patel
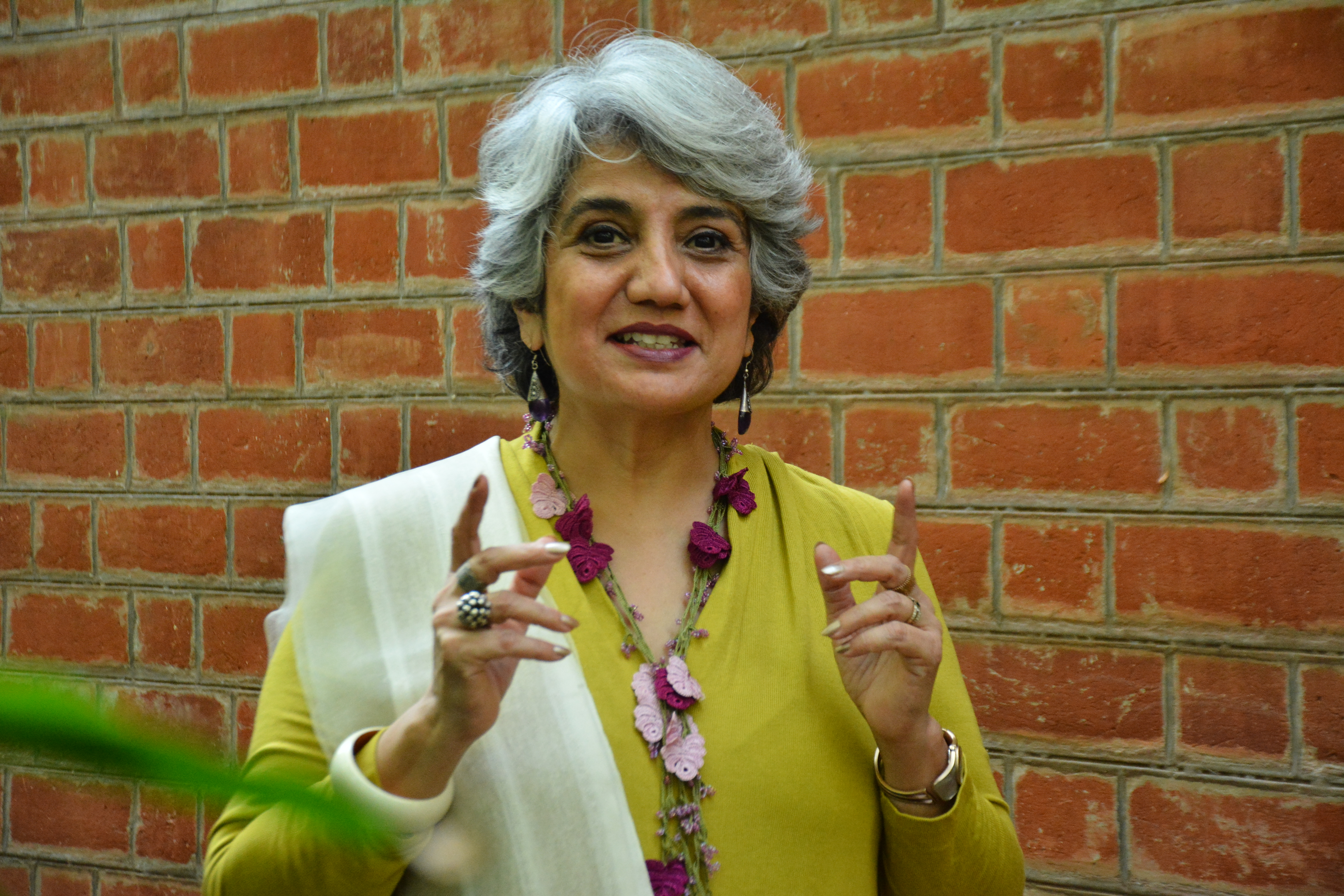
- Born: India
- Education: CEPT University, Ahmedabad; University of California, Berkeley
- Occupations: Interior designer, architect, educator, author
- Parent(s): Bhakti Patel, Hasmukh Patel
- Practice: HCP Interior Design Pvt. Ltd.
- Projects: Interiors of New Parliament Building Interiors of Vice President's Enclave Interiors of Common Central Secretariat
- Parent: Hasmukh Patel
- Relatives: Bimal Patel (brother)

Canna Hasmukh Patel is an Indian architect and interior designer based in Ahmedabad. Patel is also a visiting faculty at CEPT University and also works as a guide for the various architecture students at CEPT. Detailing and integration of art in her interiors and architecture are trademarks of her work. Patel firmly believes in simplicity and a holistic link between Interiors & Architecture.

== Early life and career ==
Canna was born to architect Hasmukh Patel and Bhakti Patel. She completed her bachelor's degree at CEPT University and Masters at University of California, Berkeley (U.S.). Canna is also the founder of the Institute of Indian Interior Designers (IIID), Ahmedabad chapter and also served as the chairperson for same. Canna founded HCPID in 2006 and has been serving as the chairperson of the organization since. HCPID has successfully completed projects in Delhi, Mumbai, Jaipur, Indore & Gujarat. There is a distinctive Indian-ness in its works, which helps to render them timeless for the setting they occupy. Patel's projects reflect a fine sensitivity to the Indian climate and social norms.

In February 2015, she was appointed as a member of Academic Advisory Board for the School of Environment Design and Architecture at the Navrachana University. In her professional career of more 30 years, she has worked on more than 300 projects of varying scale. Canna is the interiors sub-consultant for the Prestigious Central Vista Project, and has designed interiors of the New Parliament Building, Common Central Secretariat and the Vice President's Enclave.

Canna has recently launched her book Meaning is More: Interior Design for India.

== Notable works ==
- Alliance Francaise Ahmedabad
- Chief Minister's office, Gandhinagar
- Gujarat High Court
- Raj Bhavan, Gandhinagar
- New Era Global School
- Sachivalay, Gandhinagar
- Interiors of Parliament House, New Delhi
- Interiors of Common central Secretariat
- Interiors of Vice President's Enclave
- Mosaic Artwork for Paldi Jalaram Mandir Underpass

== Awards and recognition ==
- National Merit Scholarship, Government of India - 1978
- Listed at Hot 100 in 2018 by Architect and Interiors India Magazine
- Women Achievers Awards by JSAF (2013)
- Awarded for her contribution to the field of business by Business Women committee, Gujarat Chamber of Commerce and Industry (GCCI)
- Part of Forbes India 'The Bold Club: India's Top 30 Architects’ (2021)
- Listed at Hot 100 in 2024 by Architect and Interiors India Magazine

== Personal life ==
Canna is married to an academic Mukesh Patel who also runs an art management company. She is the sister of architect Bimal Patel.
