= Hasmukh Patel =

Hasmukh Patel may refer to:

- Hasmukh Patel (architect)
- Hasmukh Patel (politician)
