= Paldi =

Paldi may refer to:

- Paldi (Ahmedabad), India
- Paldi, British Columbia, Canada
