= Iti Tyagi =

Indian designer

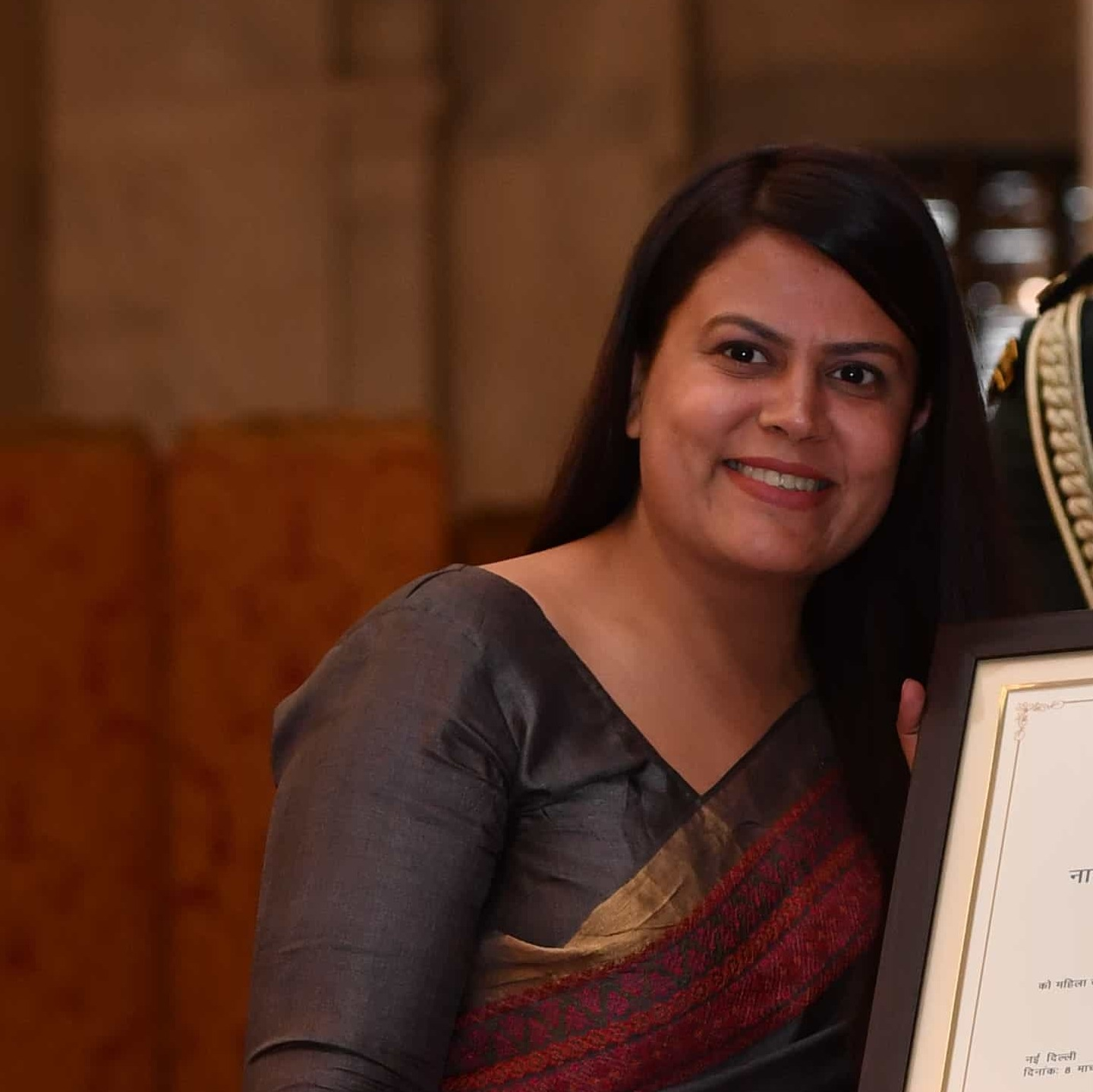
- receiving the 2018 Nari Shakti Puraskar
- Education: National Institute of Fashion Technology
- Occupation: designer
- Known for: fashion designer using cement in her work
- Spouse: Somesh Singh

Iti Tyagi is an Indian designer and social entrepreneur. In 2015, she set up Craft Village which aims to connect artisans making handicrafts directly with buyers and patrons. She received the 2018 Nari Shakti Puraskar in recognition for her work empowering women.

== Early life ==
Iti Tyagi studied Fashion Design and Clothing Technology at the National Institute of Fashion Technology. She then studied interior design at the KLC School of Design in London.

== Career ==
Tyagi is a designer in the fields of metalwork, woodwork, glassblowing and embroidery, and is also interested in sustainable development. In 2017 and 2018, her work was featured in two Craft Béton luxury collections centred around the use of cement. This resulted in a 2020 partnership to source producers making items for Craft Béton's Delhi gallery. In 2019, she exhibited a table made from cement in the Louis Quinze style. She has also worked with the National Institute of Design and the Entrepreneurship Development Institute.

She began the social enterprise Craft Village with her husband Somesh Singh in 2015, aiming to put people making handicrafts directly in contact with buyers, thus helping rural artisans to meet urban patrons. She also set up India Craft Week, International Craft Day and the International Craft Awards. The Indian handicrafts industry is expected to be worth $60 billion by the year 2024, and in the 2018–2019 financial year, the revenue of Craft Village was ₹26,700,000 (equivalent to ₹33,179,131 in 2023). Through Craft Village, Tyagi trained handicrafts workers from Balakatti, Firozabad, Kutch, Moradabad and Saharanpur.

During the COVID-19 pandemic, Tyagi designed cement fabric personal protective equipment (PPE) suits for health professionals which are made from 50% natural and 50% synthetic materials. These suits have less environmental impact when disposed of, since normal suits are 100% synthetic. The third edition of India Craft Week went online for 2020.

In 2021 Indian Craft Week returned to being an in person event at the British Council Building and the Bikaner House in New Delhi.It was arranged in partnership with the British Council.

== Animal rights ==
Tyagi founded the group Pet Parents Association which promotes the rights of pets and their owners. She was motivated by her experiences as a dog owner living in Gurugram and New Delhi. The group cares for stray dogs, promotes animal welfare and represents owners in disagreements with resident welfare associations.

== Awards and recognition ==
Recognising her work empowering women, President Ram Nath Kovind presented Tyagi with the Nari Shakti Puraskar on International Women’s Day in 2019. After receiving it she said "I urge every woman to come out of their shells and to break the stereotype".
