= Niral Mehta =

Judge of Gujarat High Court

Hon'ble Justice Niral Rashmikant Mehta

Judge of Gujarat High Court
- Incumbent
- Assumed office 18 October 2021
- Nominated by: N. V. Ramana
- Appointed by: Ram Nath Kovind

Personal details
- Born: 28 October 1976 (age 49) Ahmedabad, Gujarat, India
- Education: L.A. Shah Law College

Niral Rashmikant Mehta (born 28 October 1976) is an Indian judge, presently serving on the Gujarat High Court.

== Life ==
Justice Niral R. Mehta was born on 28 October 1976 in Ahmedabad, Gujarat India.

He studied Bachelor of Commerce from H L College for Commerce, Ahmedabad, and L.L.B from Sir L.A. Shah College, Ahmedabad.
