= St. Xavier's High School, Loyola Hall, Ahmedabad =

- Coat of arms

Location
- Naranpura, Ahmedabad, Gujarat 380013; India; 23°2′52.35″N 72°32′56.72″E

Information
- Type: Private primary and secondary school
- Motto: Latin: A teneris impende laborem (Apply yourself to hard work from an early age)
- Religious affiliation: Catholicism
- Denomination: Jesuits
- Established: 1956; 70 years ago
- Principal: Mrs. Jasmine Shaji
- Grades: K-12
- Gender: Coeducational
- Colors: Blue, red, and white
- Nickname: Loyola
- Website: www.loyolahallahd.com

St. Xavier's Loyola Hall is a Catholic school that offers primary, secondary and higher secondary education in Ahmedabad, Gujarat, India. Since 2006, it has been a co-educational school; prior to 2006, it was an all-boys school.

== History ==
St. Xavier's Loyola Hall was founded by Father Fernando Arellano S.J. on December 3, 1956. An outreach program in the 1960s led by the students and faculty of St. Xavier's Loyola Hall inspired the establishment of the St. Xavier's Social Service Society, a charitable Jesuit organization.

The St. Xavier's Loyola Hall primary school was designed by Hasmukh C. Patel.

== Academics ==
St. Xavier's Loyola Hall offers K-12 education with each standard consisting of three sections offering English medium instruction and one section offering Gujarati medium instruction. It offers science and commerce streams for standard 11 and 12.

== Notable alumni ==
The following individuals have attended St. Xavier's Loyola Hall:

- Geet Sethi (former world billiards champion, recipient of the Arjuna Award, the Padma Shri Award, the K.K. Birla Award and the Rajiv Gandhi Khel Ratna Award)
- Manmeet Pritam Singh Arora, Judge at the High Court of Delhi
- Bimal Patel (recipient of the Padma Shri Award)
- Mervin D'Souza (geologist, led the 20th Indian Scientific Expedition to Antarctica)
- Vinod Kinariwala (Independence activist and freedom fighter)
- Arpan Shah (an Indian Architect based in Ahmedabad)
- Rohit Roy (Indian actor known for his work in films and TV shows)

== See also ==
- St. Xavier's High School, Gandhinagar
- List of Jesuit educational institutions § Schools
- List of schools in Gujarat
