= St. Xavier's High School, Gandhinagar =

St. Xavier's High School, Gandhinagar, Gujarat
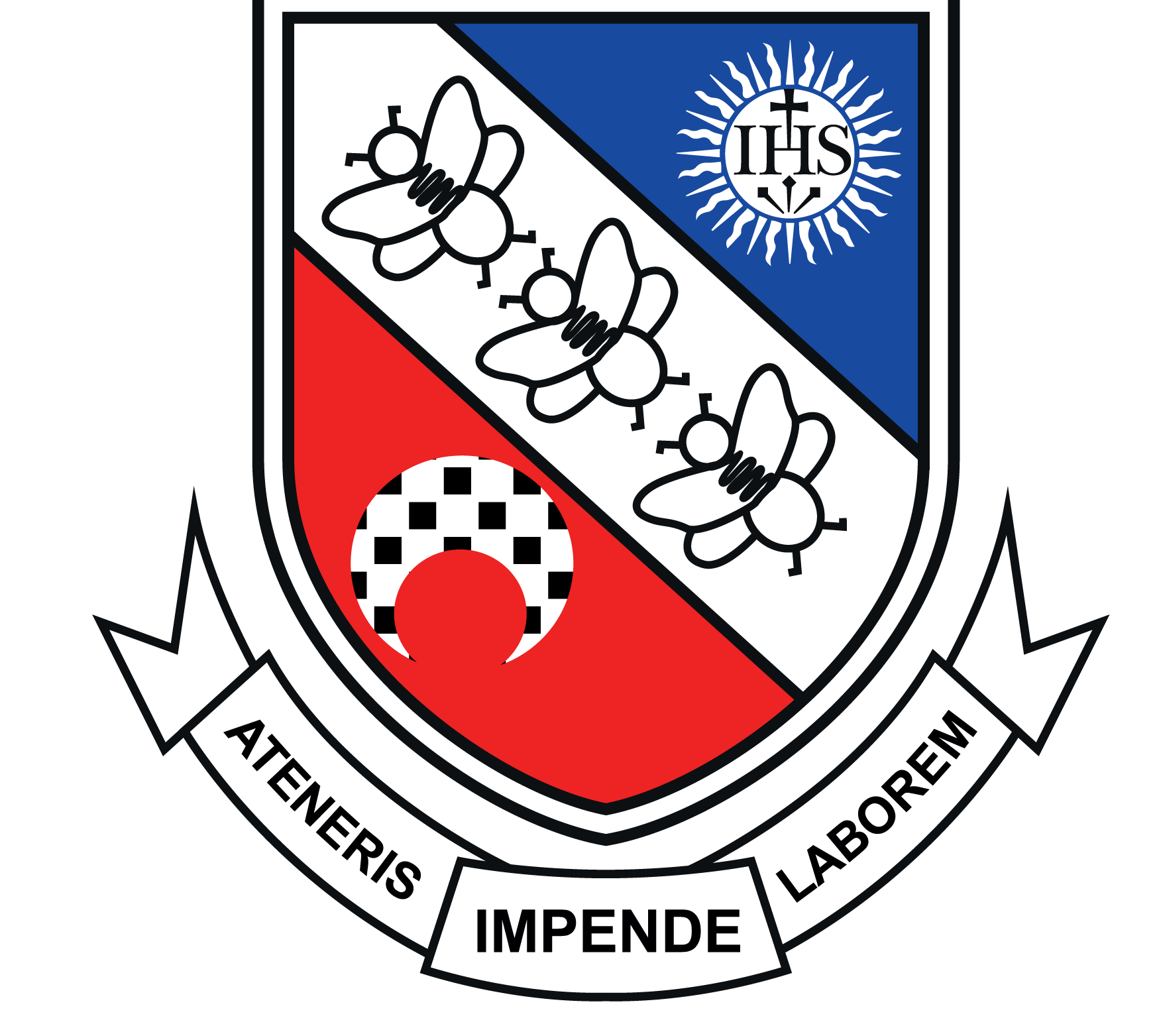

Location
- Gandhinagar, Gujarat; India; 23°12′37″N 72°39′00″E

Information
- Type: Private primary and secondary school
- Motto: Latin: A Teneris Impende Laborem (Apply yourself to hard work from an early age)
- Religious affiliation: Roman Catholic
- Denomination: Jesuits
- Established: 1970; 56 years ago
- School district: Gandhinagar
- Category: Grant-in-aid Jesuit Education Institute
- Principal: Fr. Antony Cruze. SJ
- Faculty: 100
- Grades: 1–12 (science and commerce)
- Gender: Co-educational
- Campus: 12 acres (4.9 ha)
- Houses: Red, yellow, green, blue
- Affiliation: GSEB, GSHEB
- Alumni: Ex-Xavierites
- School uniform: Boys: White shirt and grey pants; Girls: White blouse and cobalt blue skirts
- Website: www.xaviersgnr.in

St. Xavier's High School, Gandhinagar is a private Catholic primary and secondary school located in Gandhinagar, Gujarat, India. Founded in 1970 and run by the Society of Jesus, the school prepares students for the Secondary School Certificate and Higher Secondary Certificate.

== Background ==
St. Xavier's School, Gandhinagar, is run by the Jesuits. St. Francis Xavier was the first Jesuit to come to India 450 years ago, and schools throughout India are named after him.

In the late 1960s many governmental officials had their children in St. Xavier's High School, Loyola Hall, Ahmedabad, or in Mt. Carmel, Ahmedabad. When the capital was moved to Gandhinagar the Government of Gujarat assisted in the founding of Xavier's High School there and also assists with salaries for teachers, Beginning in a government building in Sector 20, in 1982 the school shifted to a sprawling campus in Sector 8, with football fields, a cricket ground, two basketball courts, a full-sized skating rink, a canteen, and a tree-filled and environmentally friendly campus.

The students come from all strata of society and the school is affiliated to the Gujarat Secondary Board of education running both Gujarati and English medium streams.

== Vision ==
The school caters mostly to children of Government officials working in Sachivalayathe. It follows the Gujarat State Board syllabus and has both the mediums running in the school – English and Gujarati. It aims to educate the well-rounded person, of service to others. The motto of the school in Latin is Ateneris Impende Laborem, which means that a child from an early age should apply himself/herself to hard work.

In the year 1996/1997 the Vedruna Sisters (Carmelites of Charity) joined the school to look after the primary and pre-primary sections.

The school has always secured more than 95% results at the Board examinations. Co-curricular activities are emphasized, with an annual athletic meet and with various other tournaments in football, cricket, basketball, and skating, besides an annual Quest festival and other inter-class competitions throughout the year.

== See also ==
- List of Jesuit schools
- List of schools in Gujarat
- Violence against Christians in India
- List of schools named after Francis Xavier
