= Harsha N. Devani =

Hon'ble Ms. Justice Retd. Harsha N. Devani

Judge of Gujarat High Court
- In office 8 October 2004 – 26 March 2020
- Nominated by: Ramesh Chandra Lahoti
- Appointed by: A. P. J. Abdul Kalam

Personal details
- Born: 27 March 1958 (age 68) Kunkavav, Amreli District, Gujarat
- Education: Gujarat University

Harsha N. Devani (born 27 March 1958) is a retired Indian judge of the Gujarat High Court.

== Life ==
Harsha N. Devani was born on 27 March 1958 in Kunkavav, Amreli district, Gujarat. She completed her secondary school education from Prakash Higher Secondary School, Ahmedabad; Little Flower Higher Secondary School, Dibrugarh, Assam; and Loreto Convent, Ranchi. She completed B. Sc. in Microbiology from M.G. Science Institute, Ahmedabad; M. Sc. in Microbiology from School of Science, Gujarat University; and LL.B. from Sir L.A. Shah Law College, Ahmedabad.

She started her career as a lawyer on 10 July 1992. She was appointed as the Additional Judge of Gujarat High Court on 8 October 2004 and later as the Permanent Judge on 9 August 2007.

She was one of two judges who heard appeals in the 2002 Naroda Patiya massacre case.

She was retired on 26 March 2020.
