= Badruddin Shaikh =

Indian politician (1952–2020)

Leader of Opposition in Ahmedabad Municipal Corporation
- In office 2010–2020

Personal details
- Born: 13 September 1952
- Died: 26 April 2020 (aged 67) Ahmedabad, Gujarat, India
- Cause of death: COVID-19
- Resting place: Ganj Shahid Kabrastan, Danilimda, Ahmedabad
- Party: Indian National Congress
- Spouse: Farida Khatun

Badruddin Shaikh (13 September 1952 – 26 April 2020) was an Indian politician and a member of the Indian National Congress. He was the Leader of the Opposition in the Ahmedabad Municipal Corporation from 2010 to 2020.

== Early life ==
Shaikh graduated from Bhakt Vallabh Dhoda College in Ahmedabad and did his post-graduation from H. K. Arts College and had studied law from L.A. Shah Law College. He practised as a lawyer before joining politics.

== Political career ==
Shaikh started his political career in 1979 as a Senate Member of Gujarat University. He served as the General Secretary of the National Students' Union of India (1984–1986) and General Secretary of the Gujarat Pradesh Youth Congress (1985-1990). Later he was a Syndicate Member of Gujarat University (1990–1993). He was a Chairman of the Minority Cell of the Gujarat Pradesh Congress Committee (1992–1995) and Vice Chairman of Minority Cell of party (2020). He was appointed the Vice President of Khawaja Saheb Dargah Committee, Ajmer Sharif Dargah by the Ministry of Minority Affairs of India.

He was elected as the Municipal Councillor in the Ahmedabad Municipal Corporation in 1995 and subsequently served four terms (1995–2000, 2000–2005, 2010–2015, 2015–2020) from Behrampura ward. During this period, he was a Chairman of the Standing Committee (2000–2003) as well as a member of Standing Committee, Town Planning Committee, Legal Committee and V. S. Hospital Management Board. He had served as the party spokesperson as well. He was the Leader of the Opposition in the Ahmedabad Municipal Corporation from 2010 to his death in 2020.

He died on 26 April 2020 from COVID-19 during the COVID-19 pandemic in India. He was buried two days later at Ganj Shahid Kabrastan in Danilimda, Ahmedabad. His wife Farida Khatun had also contracted COVID-19.
