= Sailendra Narain =

- Born: c. 1944 (age 81–82); Nawada, Bihar, India
- Occupations: Development finance specialist, banker
- Known for: SME and development finance

Sailendra Narain is an Indian development finance specialist and former banker. He has worked in the areas of small and medium-sized enterprise (SME) finance, development banking, microfinance and rural credit. He served as chairman and managing director of the Small Industries Development Bank of India (SIDBI) from 1990 to 2000.

Narain has also worked with governments, development finance institutions and international organisations on programmes relating to micro, small and medium-sized enterprises (MSMEs). He is chairman of the Centre for SME Growth and Development Finance (CESMED) in Mumbai.

== Early life and education ==
Narain was born in Nawadah, Bihar, India. He studied at Patna University, where he obtained master's degrees in sociology and economics and later completed a PhD in development economics. His doctoral research concerned the contribution of small industries to Indian economic growth.

He also completed professional training in banking and finance, including the Certified Associate of the Indian Institute of Bankers (CAIIB).

== Career ==
Narain has held positions associated with the Reserve Bank of India, the Industrial Development Bank of India (IDBI), SIDBI and the Government of Haryana.

He served as Director of Institutional Finance and Joint Secretary to the Government of Haryana and was also a non-executive director of IDBI.

=== Small Industries Development Bank of India ===
Narain served as chairman and managing director of the Small Industries Development Bank of India (SIDBI) from 1990 to 2000.

According to biographical accounts, he was nominated by IDBI to participate in a task force involved in establishing SIDBI following the enactment of the SIDBI Act in 1989.

During his tenure, SIDBI introduced programmes relating to SME finance and development. The institution also established initiatives in microcredit and expanded relationships with international financial institutions.

SIDBI received recognition during this period, including an Asian banking award in 1999.

=== Consultancy and advisory work ===
Narain is chairman of the Centre for SME Growth and Development Finance (CESMED) in Mumbai. His work has included advice on SME policy, development finance, microfinance and rural credit.

He has undertaken consultancy and advisory assignments for governments, development finance institutions and international organisations in Asia, the Middle East and Sub-Saharan Africa.

Organisations associated with his professional work include the World Bank Group, International Finance Corporation, United Nations Industrial Development Organization (UNIDO), United Nations Development Programme (UNDP), United Nations Conference on Trade and Development (UNCTAD) and other development organisations.

=== Other roles ===
Narain has served as a member of the governing body of the Entrepreneurship Development Institute of India.

He has also been associated with the United Nations Economic and Social Commission for Asia and the Pacific (UN ESCAP) Business Advisory Council and its work concerning MSMEs and entrepreneurship.

== UN ESCAP programmes ==
Narain has participated in programmes relating to entrepreneurship, socially responsible business and SME development in the Asia-Pacific region.

=== Ahmedabad Charter ===
Narain was involved in the development of the Ahmedabad Charter, which emerged from an international workshop on entrepreneurship in socially responsible business for development in Asia and the Pacific in 2013.

=== Trade finance ===
He was also involved in work relating to trade finance for SMEs in the Asia-Pacific region, including the development of recommendations concerning SME trade finance.

=== Young Business Leaders Programme ===
Narain has been associated with the Young Business Leaders Programme, which addresses entrepreneurship and socially responsible business and investment.

== International work ==
Narain's professional work has included assignments in Asia, the Middle East and Sub-Saharan Africa.

In Vietnam, he provided technical assistance in connection with an SME market development programme in the central region of the country.

== Recognition ==
Narain received the Special Honour Award from the World Association for Small and Medium Enterprises (WASME) in 1997 in recognition of his work relating to SME development.

He was also associated with the Plaque of Merit Special Award from the Association of Development Financial Institutions in Asia and the Pacific (ADFIAP) in connection with an SME market development programme in Vietnam.
