= Manmeet Pritam Singh Arora =

Indian jurist

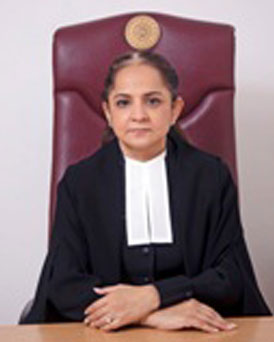
- Official portrait

Judge of the Delhi High Court
- Incumbent
- Assumed office 18 May 2022

Personal details
- Born: 1974 (age 51–52) Ahmedabad, Gujarat, India
- Education: L.A. Shah Law College, Ahmedabad
- Occupation: Judge

Manmeet Pritam Singh Arora (born 1974) is an Indian judge serving as a Justice of the Delhi High Court since 18 May 2022. She was appointed as an Additional Judge of the High Court following a recommendation by the Supreme Court Collegium and subsequent notification by the Government of India.

== Early life and education ==
Manmeet Pritam Singh Arora was born in 1974 to a business family in Ahmedabad, Gujarat. She completed her high schooling at Mount Carmel Convent School and higher schooling from St. Xavier's High School, Loyola Hall, Ahmedabad in 1991.

In 1994, she graduated from H.L. College of Commerce, Gujarat University with a B. Com degree and completed LL.B. from L.A. Shah Law College in 1997.

== Legal career ==
Arora practiced as an advocate at the Delhi High Court for 25 years, specialising in arbitration, civil, commercial, and constitutional matters. During her practice, she was appointed as Sole Arbitrator, Amicus Curiae, and Court Commissioner by the Delhi High Court on multiple occasions.

== Judicial career ==
She was elevated to the bench of the Delhi High Court on 18 May 2022. As a judge, she has delivered notable judgments on digital content regulation, defamation, deepfakes, abortion rights, and corporate disputes.
