= V. G. Patel =

Indian writer

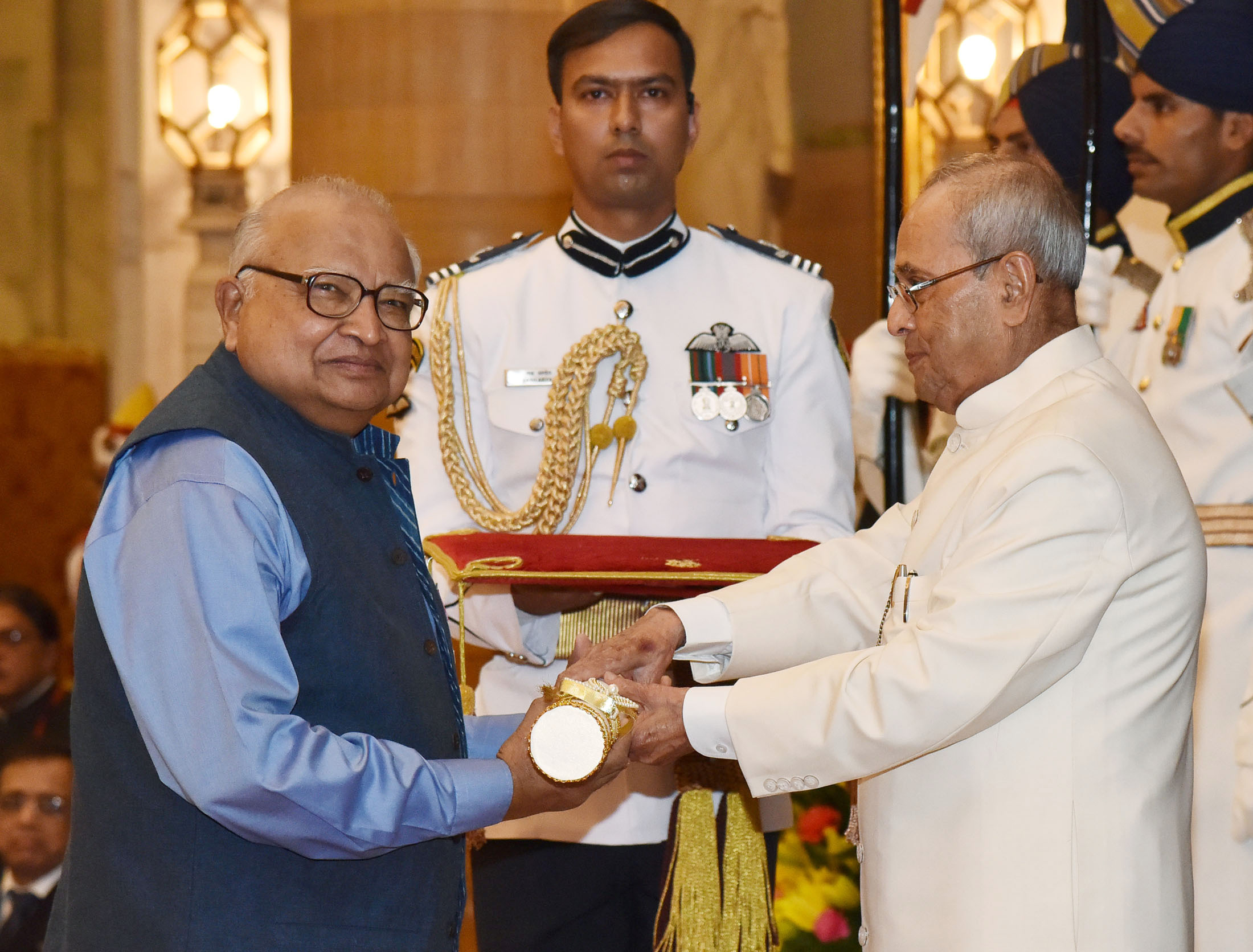
The President, Pranab Mukherjee presenting the Padma Shri Award to Dr. Viharidas Gopaldas Patel, at a Civil Investiture Ceremony, at Rashtrapati Bhavan, in New Delhi on March 30, 2017

Dr. V. G Patel is the founder director of the Entrepreneurship Development Institute of India.

Dr. V G Patel was an inspiration for many entrepreneurs in his lifetime.

Dr. V G Patel died on April 4, 2019. He is author of The Seven Business Crisis & How to Beat Them (reissued as When the Going gets Tough), Managing India's Small Industrial Economy (with V. Padmanand), and Entrepreneurship Development Programme in India and its Relevance to Developing Countries.

He was awarded Padma Shri in 2017.
