= Chitra Vishwanath =

Indian architect based in Bengaluru

- Born: Bengaluru, India
- Occupation: Architecture
- Years active: 1991–present
- Notable work: Earthen architecture and water harvesting
- Spouse: S. Vishwanath

Chitra Vishwanath is an Indian architect based in Bengaluru who works on themes related to ecology and architecture. She has been running her own architectural firm since 1991, working with other architects on many projects in India and Africa.

== Career ==
Vishwanath is currently the Principal Architect and managing director of BIOME Environment Solutions. She has been involved in more than 500 projects encompassing construction of buildings of all sizes and water harvesting and sanitation structures with specific relevance to the ecology of the sites. With earth as a basic material input in construction she has designed and built many structures.

In 2023, Vishwanath was announced as one of the judges for the Dezeen Awards, alongside notable figures such as Soho House founder Nick Jones, designer Chrissa Amuah, Material Bank's Philippe Brocart, and photographer Cristóbal Palma.

== Biography ==
Vishwanath studied for diploma in civil engineering from Nigeria and a Bachelor of Architecture degree from the CEPT University in Ahmedabad. She started her practice in 1990. Her approach in evolving architectural designs has placed emphasis on indigenous natural resources, in both an active and passive manner. Mud forms the basic element in her architectural designs in view of its easy availability, labor intensiveness, and ease of construction, incorporating water, energy and land-use processes.

In order to promote her theme of mud architecture of buildings as an environmentally sound proposition, Vishwanath built her own mud house in an area of 135 square metres (1,450 sq ft) in Bengaluru. The unique feature of this aesthetically planned house is that it does not provide for air conditioning or fans and is built with several levels. The walls made with mud bricks do not have any plaster finish. Water heating is provided by solar panels, partial electricity by photovoltaics and water harvesting facility provided for about 70% of the water requirements. The Eco-san toilet has a facility to segregate solid and liquid waste. The terrace is used to treat greywater through plants and the water so treated is used for flushing and the terrace garden. The terrace also has a bio mass heater which is used for heating water in the cold cloudy days. The terrace has a vegetable garden with an area of 1,000 square feet (93 m^{2}).

She is married to S. Vishwanath, a civil engineer specializing in water harvesting structures and water management. He is a partner in her firm.

== Bibliography ==
- Tipnis, Aishwarya (1 January 2012). Vernacular Traditions: contemporary architecture. The Energy and Resources Institute (TERI). ISBN 978-81-7993-457-9.
