= Patang =

Patang may refer to:

- Indian name for fighter kites
- Ghulam Mujtaba Patang, former Minister of Interior of Afghanistan
- Kati Patang, a 1970 Indian Hindi-language musical drama film
- Patang (1993 film), an Indian Hindi-language drama film
- Patang (2025 film), an Indian Telugu-language sports film
- Patang Hotel, a revolving restaurant in Ahmadabad, Gujarat, India
