= Bimal Patel (architect) =

Indian architect and urban planner (born 1961)

Bimal Hasmukh Patel
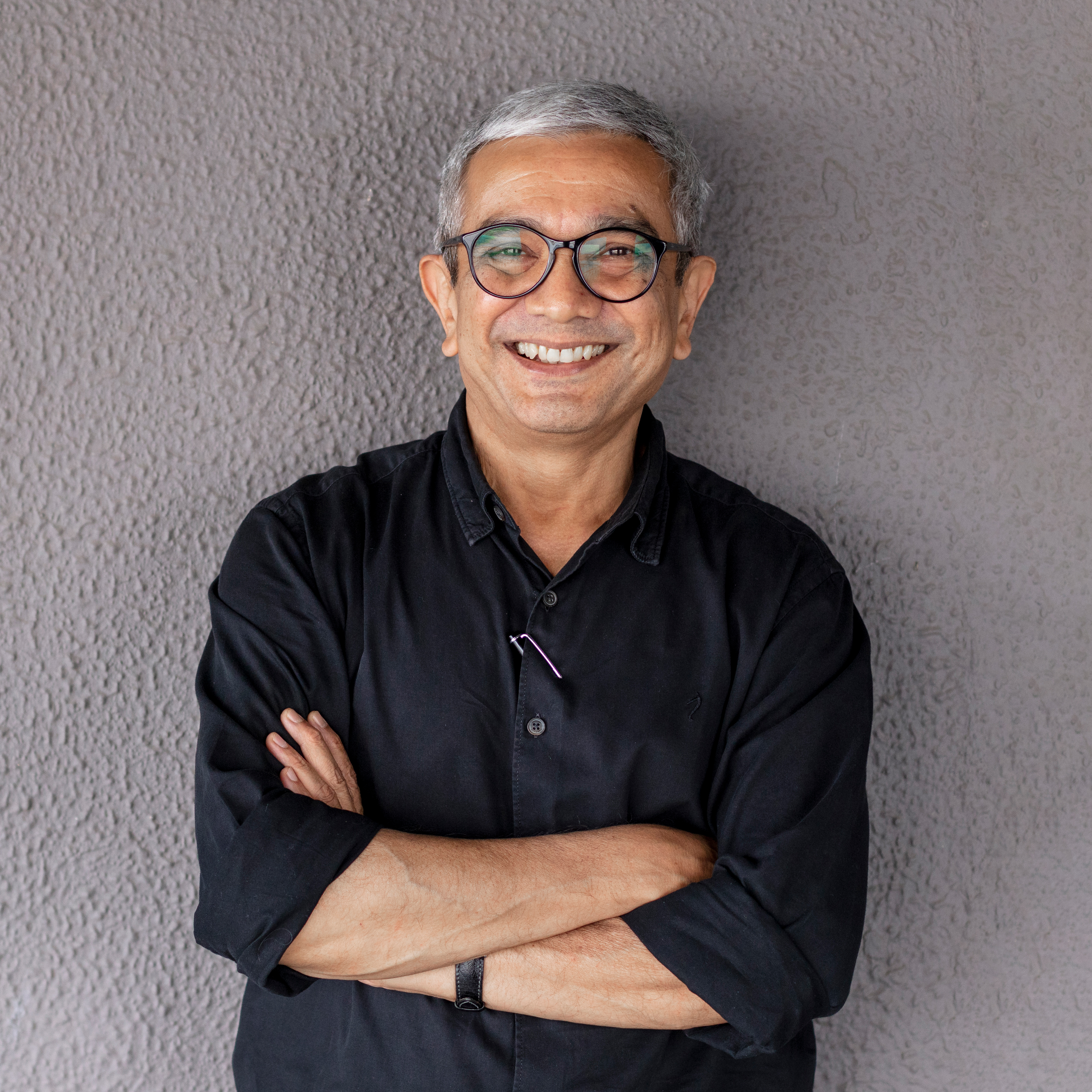
- Dr. Bimal Patel
- Born: 31 August 1961 (age 64)
- Occupations: Architect, Urban Planner, Academician
- Parent(s): Hasmukh Patel (father); Bhakti Patel (mother)
- Relatives: Canna Patel (sister)
- Awards: Aga Khan Award for Architecture (1992); Padma Shri
- Practice: HCP Design Planning & Management Pvt. Ltd.
- Buildings: Parliament House of India, Gujarat High Court
- Projects: Central Vista Redevelopment Project, Sabarmati Riverfront, Kashi Vishwanath Dham

Bimal Hasmukh Patel (born 31 August 1961) is an Indian architect, urban planner, and academic, based in Ahmedabad, India. With a career spanning over 35 years, he has made significant contributions to the fields of architecture, urban design, and urban planning through professional practice, academic leadership, and research in India. He served as the President of CEPT University, Ahmedabad, from July 2012 to January 2024, where he played a pivotal role in shaping architectural and planning education in India.

He is the Principal Architect and Managing Director of HCP Design, Planning and Management Pvt. Ltd., a multidisciplinary design, planning, and project management firm known for its work on major urban and institutional projects across India.

He is also the founder of the Environmental Planning Collaborative (EPC), a non-profit organization engaged in urban planning research and advocacy, with a focus on sustainable and inclusive urban development.

His research is focused on Land Use Planning, Real Estate Markets, Building Regulations, Land Management and Urban Planning History. He received the Padma Shri award for his contributions in the fields of Architecture and Planning in 2019.

== Early life and education ==
Bimal Patel lives and practices architecture and city planning in Ahmedabad, India. He was educated at the St. Xavier's High School, Loyola Hall, Ahmedabad. Later he studied at School of Architecture, Center for Environmental Planning and Technology, CEPT, from 1978 to 1984. In 1981, he apprenticed with Frei Otto at the Institute for Lightweight Structures, Stuttgart, Germany.

After receiving his first professional degree in architecture from CEPT in 1984 and a year of work in Ahmedabad, Patel moved to Berkeley to study at the College of Environmental Design, CED. He graduated with M.Arch. and M.C.P. degrees in 1988 and a Ph.D. from the Department of City and Regional Planning in 1995. He worked closely with Prof. Allan Jacobs, Prof. Donlyn Lyndon, Prof. Manuel Castells and Prof. Mike Teitz at the CED and Prof. Richard Walker of the Geography Department. UC Berkeley and the openness of CED provided him with the opportunity and freedom for intellectual exploration beyond the confines of Architecture and City Planning.

== Career ==
In 1990, Patel joined his father's practice in Ahmedabad. One of his first building design projects, a campus for The Entrepreneurship Development Institute, Ahmedabad, won the Aga Khan Award for Architecture in 1992. Over the years he has built up a significant body of work ranging from single-family homes, to institutions, industrial buildings and urban redevelopment projects. Urban design projects, like the Kankaria Lake Development and the Sabarmati Riverfront, are the first of their kind in the country.

His significant and award-winning projects include the Aga Khan Academy Hyderabad, Ahmedabad Management Association, Bhuj Development Plan and Town Planning Schemes (post-earthquake), C G Road Redevelopment, Entrepreneurship Development Institute of India, Gujarat High Court, Indian Institute of Management, Ahmedabad New Campus, Kankaria Lake, Sabarmati Riverfront and the Swarnim Sankul at Gandhinagar.

His work and his projects have been conferred with numerous awards including the Aga Khan Award for Architecture (1992), United Nations Centre for Human Settlements' Award of Excellence (1998), World Architecture Award (2001) and the Prime Minister’s National Award for Excellence in Urban Planning and Design (2006). He was bestowed with the Padma Shri award in 2019.

Patel has been the President of CEPT University in Ahmedabad from July 2012 to January 2024. CEPT University focuses on understanding, designing, planning, constructing, and managing human habitats. His work there involved academics as well as institutional leadership and development.

== Significant projects ==
=== Architecture and Urban Design ===
- Parliament House and Central Vista Transformation, Government of India, New Delhi, 2019 - Ongoing
- Vishwanath Dham, Sri Kashi Vishwanath Mandir, Varanasi, 2018 - ongoing
- Ministers’ Blocks and Secretariat Campus Development, Government of Gujarat, Gandhinagar, 2014
- Aga Khan Academy, Hyderabad, 2014
- Pandit Deendayal Energy University, Gandhinagar, 2006 - ongoing
- Sabarmati Riverfront Development Project, Detailed Design – 1998 - ongoing
- Tata CGPL Township, Mundra, 2009
- New Campus, Indian Institute of Management, Ahmedabad, 2000
- Re-development of C.G. Road, Ahmedabad, 1995
- The Gujarat High Court Building, Ahmedabad, 1992
- The Entrepreneurship Development Institute of India, Ahmedabad, 1985
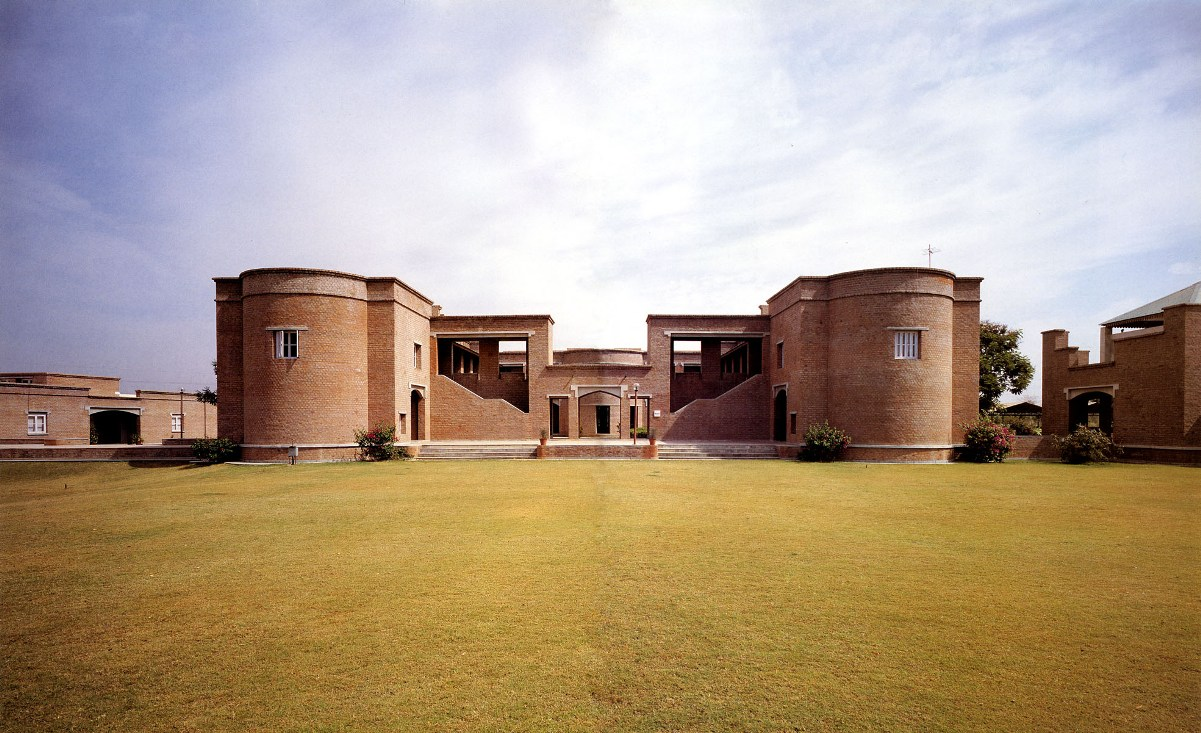
  The Entrepreneurship Development Institute of India

=== Planning ===
- Transformational Vision Plan for Ahmedabad and Gandhinagar - 2041
- Redevelopment of Mumbai Eastern Waterfront (Mumbai Port Trust), MbPT, 2017 – ongoing
- Planned Densification of Ahmedabad’s CBD, AUDA, 2015
- Town Planning Schemes, Ahmedabad – Statutory, 2012
- Streamlining Urban Planning and Land Management (SUPLM) World Bank - 2007
- Bhuj Development and (walled city) Town Planning Schemes – Statutory, 2004
- Building Byelaws and Planning Legislation for Delhi (MCD) – Statutory, 2004
- Development Plan for the Ahmedabad Urban Development Authority (AUDA) – Statutory, 2002
- Walled City Revitalization Plan, Ahmedabad, 1997

=== Publications ===
- The Realm of the Public – A Conversation with Bimal Patel (2023). Matter. Inside Publication, Volume 3, Issue 1, 88-111.
- Bimal Patel. Central Vista Redevelopment Project (December 2022). NIC, Yojana, Architect’s Reflections, 11-16.
- Bimal Patel. Balkrishna Doshi’s Architectural Practice. (2023) Architecture Time, Space and People. Remembering Doshi: Special Edition, 44-46.
- Bimal Patel. (2021). Improving Indian Urban Planning. In Mumbai Reader 20/21. Urban Design Research Institute.
- Sweta Byahut, Bimal Patel, & Jignesh Mehta. (2020). Emergence of sub-optimal land utilization patterns in Indian cities. Journal of Urban Design, Routledge, 25(6), 758–777.
- Bimal Patel. (2019, September 18). Unfolding the architecture of Hasmukh Patel. STIR.
- Bimal Patel. (2018, March 1). The Architects Regulations of 1989 must evolve to match present realities. IFJ.
- Bimal Patel, Sweta Byahut, & Brijesh Bhatha. (2018). Building regulations are a barrier to affordable housing in Indian cities: The case of Ahmedabad. Journal of Housing and the Built Environment, Springer Netherlands, 33(1), 175–195.
- Bimal Patel. (2017, April 30). Stepwells to skyscrapers: Building Identity. Ahmedabad Mirror.
- Patricia Clarke Annez, Bijal Bhatt, & Bimal Patel. (2017). What Getting Legal Land Title Really Means: An ‘Anti-commons’ in Ahmedabad, India? Review of Market Integration, SAGE, 9(1–2), 1–26.
- Bimal Patel. (2017). ULTIMATE DESIGN HERO. Elle Decor, 208.
- Bimal Patel & Catherine Desai. (2016). The Architecture of Hasmukh C. Patel, Selected Projects 1963 – 2003. Mapin Publishing.
- Bimal Patel. (2016, January 27). Preservation vs a clean break. Indian Express.
- Bimal Patel. (2015, July 11). City Planning – ‘Vertical growth: Do not limit floor space index to limit congestion’. Indian Express.
- Bimal Patel. (2015, June 6). On land, a new way. Indian Express.
- Bimal Patel. (2015, April 22). Managing politics of urban planning. Mint.
- Bimal Patel. (2015). An Ethical Education for Urban Professionals. In Richard Mahapatra, Archana Yadav, Vibha Varshney, Sunita Narain, Aruna P. Sharma, Kaushik Das Gupta, & Snigdha Das (Eds.), State of India’s Environment 2015. Centre For Science And Environment.
- Bimal Patel & VK Phatak. (2014). Integrating redevelopment of slums in city planning. In Isher Judge Ahluwalia, Ravi Kabur, & P.K. Mohanty (Eds.), Urbanisation in India- Challenges, Opportunities and the Way Forward (pp. 260–296). SAGE India.
- Ballaney, S., Marie-Agnes Bertaud, Patricia Clarke Annez, CK Koshy, Bindu Nair, Bimal Patel, Vidyadhar Phatak, & Vasudha Thawakar. (2013). Inventory of public land in Ahmedabad, Gujarat, India. World Bank Policy Research Working Paper, 6664.
- Bimal Patel. (2013, August 16). Bimal Patel: We Have to Free Our Cities from the State’s Clutches. India Forbes.
- Patricia Clarke Annez, Alain Bertaud, Marie-Agnes Bertaud, Bijal Bhatt, Chirayu Bhatt, Vidyadhar Phatak, & Bimal Patel. (2012). Ahmedabad More but Different Government for “Slum Free” and Livable Cities. World Bank Policy Research Working Paper 6267.
- Bimal Patel, Rajendra Joshi, Shirley Ballaney, & Matthias Nohn. (2011). Slum Planning Schemes: A Statutory Framework for Establishing Secure Tenure and Improving Living Conditions in Indian Slums. Environment and Urbanization ASIA, 2(1), 45–75.
- Bimal Patel. (2011). Riverfront Redevelopment. In Chris Johnson (Ed.), Indian Cities: Managing Urban Growth. METROPOLIS and National Institute of Urban Affairs.
- Patricia Clarke Annez, Alain Bertaud, Bimal Patel, & V. K. Phatak. (2010). Working with the Market: Approach to Reducing Urban Slums in India. World Bank.
- Bimal Patel, Shirley Ballaney, CK Koshy, & Matthias Nohn. (2009). Reforming urban land management in Gujarat. Oxford University Press.
- Shirley Ballaney & Bimal Patel. (2009). Using the ‘Development Plan—Town planning scheme’ mechanism to appropriate land and build urban infrastructure. India Infrastructure Report, 190–204.
- Bimal Patel. (1995). Gujarat High Court, Ahmedabad. Architecture+ Design, 12(3), 65–76.
- Bimal Patel. (1995). The space of property capital: Property development and architecture in Ahmedabad - ProQuest [University of California, Berkeley].
- Bimal Patel. (1988). Form, space and order: Learning from formal structure in Indian Islamic architecture. University of California, Berkeley.

== Research Areas ==
- Land Use Planning
- Real Estate Markets
- Building Regulations
- Land Management
- Architecture and Urban Planning History

== Teaching ==
- Visiting Faculty at School of Architecture and School of Planning, CEPT, Ahmedabad, India
- Guest Lectures: Indian Institute of Management, Ahmedabad; LBSNAA, Mussoorie

== Awards and honors ==
- Padma Shri, 2019
- Distinguished Alumnus Award, College of Environmental Design, University of California, Berkeley, 2008
- Prime Ministerʼs National Award for Excellence in Urban Planning and Design, awarded to the Sabarmati Riverfront Development Project, 2006
- Emerging Architect Commendation Award, AR+D, 2001
- World Architecture Award, 2001
- Salzburg Seminar Fellowship, 2000
- UNCHS, Best Practices Award, 1998
- The Aga Khan Award for Architecture, 1992
- Research Fellowship, American Institute of Indian Studies, 1990–91
- Newhouse Foundation Grant, 1988–89
- Outstanding Graduate Student Instructor Award, 1987
- College of Environmental Design Council Scholarship, 1985–86

== Reviews and Exhibitions of Professional Work ==
=== In Periodicals and Books ===
- Buckley, R. M., Kallergis, A., & Wainer, L. (2016). Addressing the housing challenge: Avoiding the Ozymandias syndrome. Environment and Urbanization, 28(1), 119–138. https://doi.org/10.1177/0956247815627523
- GICEA. (2015, December). GICEA Quarterly Journal Nirman: Smart Cities 2. The Gujarat Institute of Civil Engineers and Architects (Ahmedabad, 87(3).
- Architecture + Design. (2015, August). Exposure Media Marketing Pvt. Ltd.
- Focus Story: Cladding Solutions: Innovations & Experience—Experts views. (2015, July). Window & Facade Magazine. F & F Media and Publications (New Delhi), 2(2), 63–70.
- Architect and Interiors India: May 2015. (2015, May). ITP Publishing India, 7(2).
- Goel Sanghi & Preeti. (2015). Correa: A Master Renown. ABEC Exhibitions & Conferences Pvt. Ltd.
- Scriver, P., & Srivastava, A. (2015). India: Modern architecture in history. Reaktion Books.
- Kruti Kothari. (2014, April). Insite: A Walk Through The World of IIID and Beyond. Kamal Khokhani (Ahmedabad), 7(4).
- Imran Ahmad Khan. (2014, January). Construction Architecture Update. Era Fame Media Group.
- GICEA. (2014). GICEA Nirman. The Gujarat Institute of Civil Engineers and Architects.
- The Place of Nature in Tomorrow `s City: Proceedings of 8th ISOLA Conference: Bhopal 31 August and 1 September 2012. (2012). ISOLA Annual Conference, Bhopal 2012 Local Organizing Committee.
- India’s Leading Architects. Architecture: Bimal Patel of HCP. (2011, June). Wallpaper: Team Building, 122–126.
- Architectural Work of Bungalows. (2011). The Gujarat Institute of Civil Engineers & Architects.
- Aruna Rathod. (2011). Architect and Interiors India: March 2011. Architect and Interiors India.
- Chha Gaam Patidar Mandal, Ahmedabad. (2011). Kautumbik Mahiti Granth.
- Mehrotra, R. (2011). Architecture in India: Since 1990. Pictor.
- Mostafavi, M., Asad, M. al-, & Derakhshani, F. (2011). Aga Khan Award for Architecture. Lars Müller Publishing.
- My First Project—Dr. Bimal H. Patel. (2011). Elle Decor.
- Nishith Trivedi, Ashish Bhatia, & Avinash Kumar. (2011). Sabarmati River Front Development. In Divya Bhaskar (Ed.), Vibrant Spaces: Sthapatya Shilpi.
- Prabhakar B. Bhagwat, Nitin B. Shah, & Seva Vij. (2011). Udaan.
- Smita Dalvi. (2011). Louver as protagonist. Domus India, 1(1), 46–59.
- The Phaidon atlas of 21st century world architecture. (2011). Phaidon.
- Urban Journal: Show Them What You are Making—India Real Time. (2011). The Wall Street Journal.
- Pool Magazine, Oct 2010: An Interview with Dr.Bimal Patel. (2010, October 1). Pool Magazine, 4, 18–21.
- Indian Institute of Management Ahmedabad. (2010). IIMA: India’s management athenaeum. Indian Institute of Management Ahmedabad.
- R. Gregory. (2010). ʻIndian Institute of Managementʼ, Buildings. The Architectural Review, CCXXVIII(1363), 66–71.
- Rössl, S. (2009). Architettura Contemporanea: India. Motta architettura.
- Himanshu Burte. (2008). Extending an Icon. Mint, 2(152), 12–13.
- Neelkanth Chhaya. (2008). Spade: Architecture And Politics: Vol 1. SRDA (Mumbai), 70–87.
- R. Rajaram. (2008). Sabarmati: India’s First Riverfront Development. Architecture Update, 1(22), 9.
- Shah, J. (2008). Contemporary Indian architecture. Lustre Press, Roli Books.
- B. Sheth. (2007). Riverfront redux—More to Sabarmati project than meets the eye. Down to Earth, 7–8.
- Deobhakta, M., & Deobhakta, M. (2007). Architectural practice in India (2nd ed). Council of Architecture.
- Gast, K.-P. (2007). Modern traditions: Contemporary architecture in India. Birkhäuser ; Springer [distributor].
- Home Review. (2006, January). Anish Bajaj (Mumbai), 5(1).
- A. Pilo. (2006). A Linear Scale. Architecture + Design, XXIII(2), 50–54.
- The Indian Institute of Architects. (2006). Architects Directory & Professional Handbook 2006. Media Vintage (New York).
- H. Carsten. (2005). Campus Extension of IIMA. Bauwelt, 6, 2.
- Yatin Pandya & Trupti Rawal. (2002). The Ahmedabad Chronicle: Imprints of a Millennium. The Vastu Shilpa Foundation.
- Neelkanth Chhaya, Jigar Patel, & Ranjit Wagh. (2002). Kurula Varkey Commemorative Monograph. Centre for Environmental Planning and Technology.
- EPC and AUDA. (2001). Planning A Square Mile: Exploring the Potential of Town Planning Scheme Mechanism. The Indo-Dutch Urban Development Workshop (Ahmedabad).
- P. Davy. (2001). Indian Summary. The Architectural Review, CCX(1258), 74–75.
- N. Jackson. (2001). World Architecture Awards 2001: Regional Winner: Education Category – Ahmedabad Management Association.
- Mehrotra, R. (Ed.). (2000). World architecture 1900 - 2000: A critical mosaic (Vol. 8). Springer.
- CEPT Ahmedabad. (1997). Kagaz: Architecture and Housing Projects. CEPT Ahmedabad.
- Lang, J. T., Desai, M., & Desai, M. (1997). Architecture and independence: The search for identity--India 1880 to 1980. Oxford University Press.
- P. Wilslocki. (1997). Ahmedabad Authority: The Gujarat High Court Complex. World Architecture, 58, 62–63.
- 581 architects in the world. (1995). Toto Shuppan.
- Bahga, S., Bahga, S., & Bahga, Y. (1993). Modern architecture in India: Post-independence perspective. Galgotia Pub. Co.
- Steele, J. & Academy Editions (Eds.). (1992). Architecture for a changing world: The Aga Khan award for architecture. Academy Editions.
- M. Chauhan. (1989). Spatial Experiences. Architecture+Design.
- Ranjit Sabikhi. (1989). Significant for Its Vernacular Sensitivity And Its Simplicity. Architecture.
- Contemporary Architecture in India: The emerging generation. (1987). 38.

=== Exhibitions ===
- (2024). Ahmedabad Commons
- (2024). Ahmedabad Collective
- (2024). Gandhi Ashram Masterplan Inauguration Exhibition
- (2022). Kartavya Path Inauguration Exhibition
- (2022). Surat Smart Cities Exhibition.
- (2021). Architecture of Hasmukh C. Patel.
- (2021). Ahmedabad Collective.
- (2021). London design Biennale—India Pavilion.
- (2019). Vibrant Gujarat, 2019
- (2018). An exhibition of Hasmukh C. Patel’s works at CEPT University
- (2018) The State of Housing.
- (2018). In Progress—An exhibition of 20 Projects at Paritosh Gallery
- (2016). Venice Biennale 2016.
- (2016). The Architecture of Hasmukh C. Patel’ Book Release Exhibition.
- (2016). The state of architecture: Practices & processes in India : documenting the exhibition and its allied events, 6 January-20 March 2016, National Gallery of Modern Art, Mumbai.
- (2015). Adorning Waterfronts
- (2015). Special Tribute to India’s Greatest Architect Padma Vibhushan Charles Correa.
- (2014). AUDA - CBD Exhibition.
- (2013). Four Cities, Four Proposals.
- (2011, April). Indian Architectural Design Festival.
- (2010). HCP @50: Envisioning the Sabarmati Riverfront.
- (2009). Aedes Gallery.
- (2003). Aedes Gallery.
- (1998). Mohile Parikh Centre for Visual Arts.
