= Chimanlal Girdharlal Road =

Major road of Ahmedabad, India

C. G. Road
- Chiman Lal Girdhar Lal Road
- Maintained by: Ahmedabad Municipal Corporation
- Length: 2.23 mi (3.59 km)
- South end: Mahalaxmi Crossroads, Paldi
- North end: Sardar Patel Stadium Crossroads, Navrangpura

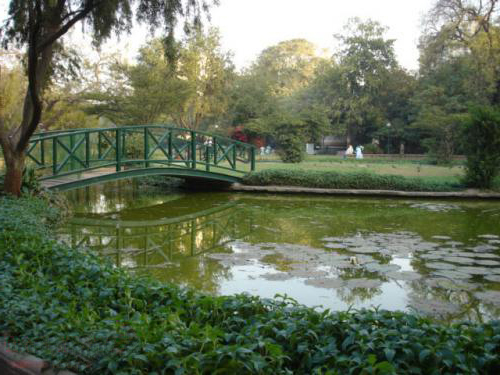
View of Parimal Garden which forms part of neighbourhood

Chimanlal Girdharlal Road, colloquially the C. G. Road, is one of the major roads of Ahmedabad. It has been ranked as the costliest retail location in the city.

It is named after Chimanlal Girdharlal, one of the major businessmen of the 1960s in India.

C.G. Road was redesigned in the 1990s, which turned the road into a major financial hub of Ahmedabad. In 2010, it was ranked in "Main Streets Across the World 2010" by real estate firm Cushman & Wakefield on 3rd position for its strongest growth in Asia Pacific region behind Linking Road, Mumbai & Central, Hong Kong with annual Rental Growth 18.2%.

It starts at Mahalaxmi Crossroads and ends at Sardar Patel Stadium Crossroads, in turn connecting Paldi to Navrangpura.
