= Vice President's Enclave =

Official residence of the Vice President of the Republic of India

Vice-President's Enclave
- Location within Delhi

General information
- Location: 108, Church Road, New Delhi, Delhi – 110006, India
- Coordinates: 28°37′00″N 77°12′14″E
- Current tenants: C. P. Radhakrishnan and his family
- Construction started: 22 February 2021; 5 years ago
- Completed: 15 February 2024; 2 years ago
- Opened: 18 February 2024; 2 years ago

Technical details
- Size: 6.1 ha (15 acres)

Design and construction
- Architect: Bimal Patel
- Architecture firm: HCP Design, Planning and Management Pvt. Ltd.
- Main contractor: Kamladityya Construction Pvt. Ltd.

Other information
- Public transit: Central Secretariat

Website
- vicepresidentofindia.nic.in

Vice President's Enclave (IAST: Uparashtrapati Bhavan) is the official residence and workplace of the Vice President of the Republic of India, located on 108, Church Road, New Delhi - 110 001.

== History ==
From May 1962 until February 2024, the bungalow located at 6, Maulana Azad Road in New Delhi served as the official residence of the Vice President of India. The area of the residence was 6.48 acres (2.62 ha). It was a standalone building with limited facilities. It shared a common boundary wall with the Vigyan Bhavan Annexe on the west and was bounded by Maulana Azad Road in the south, Man Singh Road in the east, and the green area abutting Kartavya Path.

As a part of the Central Vista Redevelopment Project, a new residence and secretariat for the Vice President was built at 108, Church Road, New Delhi. The then Vice President Jagdeep Dhankhar and his family were the first to move into the new Vice-President Enclave on 14 February 2024 on the occasion of Vasant Panchami.

The new complex is the first of the residential premises under the Central Vista redevelopment plan to be completed. The Enclave spans a 15-acre plot with a built-up area of 215,278 square feet and a total plinth area of approximately 20,000 square meters. It comprises multiple structures, including the Residence, featuring one basement, a ground floor, and an upper floor; a Secretariat building with a ground and an upper floor; a CPWD block with similar specifications; and barracks, also consisting of a ground and an upper floor. Additional facilities include a Guest House, a Sports Facility with a single ground floor, swimming pool, staff Quarters with a ground and upper floor, and various Ancillary Buildings with ground floors of varying heights.

=== Early history ===
The bungalow at 6, Maulana Azad Road was constructed in the 1920s as part of the larger New Delhi redevelopment scheme, which was undertaken following the decision to shift the capital of India from Calcutta to Delhi. This plan, led by architects such as Edwin Lutyens and Herbert Baker, included a plan for the creation of a series of residential bungalows to house senior British officials. Designed by Robert Tor Russell, a prominent architect of the era, the bungalow exemplified the colonial architectural style of the time, with spacious interiors, high ceilings, and expansive lawns. The road was formerly known as King Edward Road.

=== Designation as Vice President's Residence ===
Following the adoption of the Indian Constitution in 1950, the position of Vice President was created as the second-highest constitutional office in the country. When Dr. Sarvepalli Radhakrishnan became the first Vice President of India in 1952, 6, King Edward Road (as it was known earlier) was selected to serve as the official residence due to its proximity to the central administrative buildings such as Rashtrapati Bhavan, Parliament House, and other official buildings.

It was only after the death of India’s first education minister, Maulana Azad, that the road, where his bungalow no. 4 was located, was renamed Maulana Azad Road in his honor.

=== New Vice President's Enclave ===
Given that the previous residence of the Vice President was a standalone, mid-sized bungalow with limited facilities, the urgent need for a larger residence and an upgraded secretariat arose.

Under the Central Vista Redevelopment Project, a new and significantly larger residence, along with a dedicated secretariat for the Vice President, was constructed at 108, Church Road, New Delhi. It is located adjacent to the North Block. The plot of land on which it stands was previously used for defense hutments.

Covering an area of 6 hectares, besides the main residence building, the complex includes extensive facilities comprising various service and support buildings.

== Architecture and Design ==
The Enclave was conceived as part of the Central Vista Redevelopment Project, aimed at modernizing and reorganizing the administrative infrastructure of India's capital. It is designed by Bimal Patel, in collaboration with Central Public Works Department (CPWD).

The complex is situated on Church Road, adjacent to the North Block, in close proximity to key government institutions. The design prioritizes security, sustainability, and functionality, while also respecting the historical and symbolic significance of New Delhi.

The main residence is a low-rise structure that infuses Indian Rajasthani architectural elements like Jali, Jharokha, and verandah with Lutyens-inspired structure characterised by clean geometric forms and expansive green areas. Sandstone is the main element used in the facade. The two main types of stones used for the facade are Dholpur sandstone and Red Agra sandstone.

Known for its durability and warm beige-pink hue, Dholpur sandstone has been used to maintain visual continuity with the broader Central Vista aesthetic. The Agra sandstone has also been selectively used to provide contrast and accentuate architectural details such as columns, cornices, and entryways.

The enclave includes a dedicated secretariat for the Vice President’s official functions, staff quarters, guest facilities, and service buildings, all integrated within a secure compound. Landscaped gardens, water features, and shaded pathways enhance the usability and visual appeal of the premises, promoting a sense of openness and tranquility despite its high-security requirements.

The layout is designed to optimize movement, maintain dignified protocol zones, and accommodate both ceremonial and day-to-day administrative functions. Barrier-free access and smart building systems have been integrated so that the complex meets contemporary standards of accessibility and efficiency.

== See also ==
- List of official residences of India
- 7, Race Course Road - official residency of the Prime Minister of India
- Rashtrapati Bhavan - official residence of the President of India
