= Achal Bakeri =

Indian entrepreneur and founder, chairman and managing director

- Born: Mumbai, Maharashtra, India
- Education: CEPT University; University of Southern California
- Occupation: Businessman

Achal Bakeri is an Indian billionaire entrepreneur and founder, chairman and managing director of Symphony Limited.

== Early life and education ==
Bakeri was born in Mumbai, Maharashtra, to father Anil Bakeri, a real estate businessman, and mother Hansabahen.

Bakeri completed his diploma in architecture from CEPT University, located in Ahmedabad, and a Master of Business Administration in the United States from the University of Southern California, located in Los Angeles, California.

== Career ==
He returned to India and started working with his father's real estate business in Ahmedabad.

=== Symphony ===
In February 1988, Bakeri started Symphony Limited in Ahmedabad with a seed capital of INR 100,000. The company was about to go bankrupt in 2002, but after purchasing a majority stake in a Mexico company, Bakeri claims it became the world's largest air-cooler manufacturing company. In February 2017, Symphony launched air cooler with multiple features like touch screen, voice assist, mosquito repellent.

=== Awards and recognitions ===
Bakeri is the recipient of awards including:

Year	Title
1992	Rotary International Entrepreneur of the year
1995	India Young Business Achiever Award
	Finalist World Young Business Achiever in London
2014	EY Entrepreneur of year Award (finalist)
2015	Forbes List of Billionaires 2015

=== Associations ===
Bakeri also serves as a director of Symphony Limited, Sanskrut Tradecom Private Limited, Bakeri Engineering & Infrastructure, Harmony Holdings Private Limited, Oras Investments Private Limited, Paratam Investments Private Limited and Bakeri Urban Development.

== See also ==
- List of people from Ahmedabad
- List of University of Southern California people
