= L.A. Shah Law College =

Law college in Gujarat

- Type: Public
- Established: 1927
- Affiliation: Gujarat University
- Principal: Dr. Bimal Patel
- Location: Ahmedabad, Gujarat, India
- Campus: Urban
- Website: lashahlawcollege.edu.in

L.A. Shah Law College is a heritage Law college of Ahmedabad, in the State of Gujarat. This college has gained the approval of Bar Council of India (BCI), New Delhi. It offers three years undergraduate course (LL.B. or Bachelor of Law) and LL.M. degree in legal education affiliated to the Gujarat University.

== History ==
Gujarat Law Society established the college on 20 June 1927. It is the fourth oldest Law College to be affiliated to the University of Bombay. Initially the University of Bombay recognised the college in 1935. Thereafter Gujarat University gave the affiliation in 1950.

== Alumni ==
- Jayantilal Chhotalal Shah, Former Chief Justice of India
- Aziz Mushabber Ahmadi, Former Chief Justice of India
- Manmeet Pritam Singh Arora, Judge at the High Court of Delhi
- C. K. Thakker, Judge of the Supreme Court of India
- Nomanbhai Mahmedbhai Miabhoy, Chief Justice of Gujarat High Court
- Suresh Mehta, Former Chief Minister of Gujarat
- Anil R. Dave, Judge of the Supreme Court of India
- Manharlal Pranlal Thakkar, Judge of the Supreme Court of India
- Manharlal Bhikhalal Shah, Judge of the Supreme Court of India
- Rashmin Manharbhai Chhaya, Judge of Gujarat High Court
- Badruddin Shaikh
- Ela Bhatt
- Chinu Modi
- Vijay Patel
- Harsha N. Devani
- Rekha Doshit
