= CEPT University =

Academic institution in Ahmedabad, India

- Motto in English: knowledge with scientific realization
- Type: Private University
- Established: 1962
- President: Barjor Mehta
- Director: Barjor Mehta (acting)
- Location: Ahmedabad, Gujarat, India; 23°02′15″N 72°32′59″E
- Campus: Kasturbhai Lalbhai Campus
- Website: www.cept.ac.in

CEPT University, formerly the Centre for Environmental Planning and Technology, is an academic institution located near University Area in Ahmedabad, India offering undergraduate, postgraduate and doctoral programmes in areas of natural and developed environment of human society and related disciplines.

== History ==
The Centre for Environment Planning & Technology was established as the School of Architecture in 1962, by The Ahmedabad Education Society (AES), followed by the School of Planning, School of Building Science and Technology and School of Interior Design in 1972, 1982 and 1991 respectively, which were established with aid from the Ministry of Human Resource Development, the Government of Gujarat and the Ford Foundation.

Until 2002 the institute was autonomous and awarded its own diplomas while being recognized by the All India Council of Technical Education (AICTE). From 2002 to 2005 it was affiliated to Hemchandracharya North Gujarat University. In 2005 it became a university through the Centre for Environmental Planning and Technology University Act, 2005. It was renamed "CEPT University" through CEPT University Act, 2010.

== Academics ==
=== Faculty of Architecture ===
The Faculty of Architecture was established as the 'School of Architecture' in 1962. It focuses on design in the private realm. It offers Masters in Landscape Architecture, a course established by Landscape Department since 1993.

=== Faculty of Planning ===
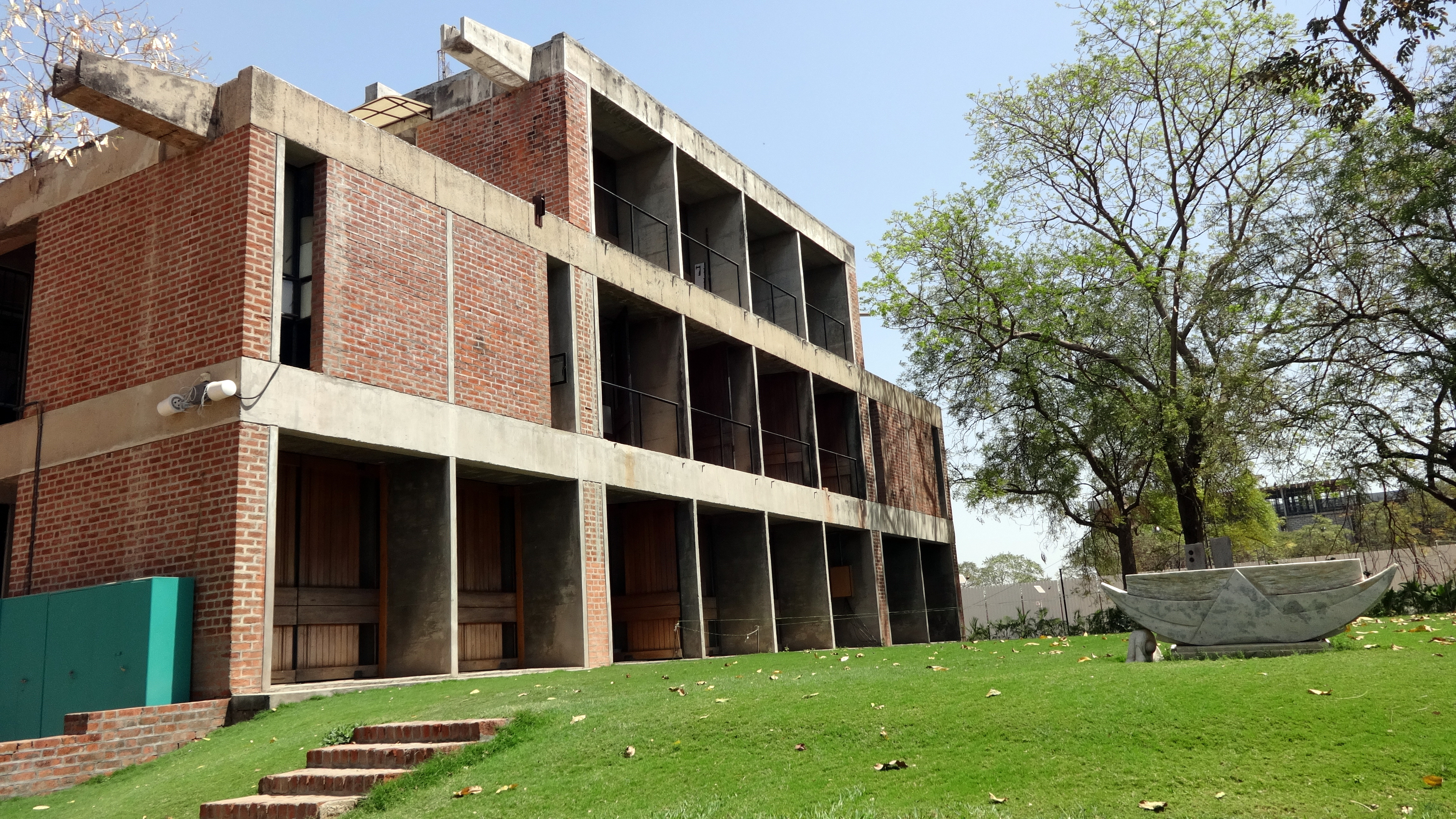
Faculty of Planning, CEPT University

The Faculty of Planning, focused on planning in the public realm, was established in 1972 as the 'School of Planning'.

=== Faculty of Technology ===
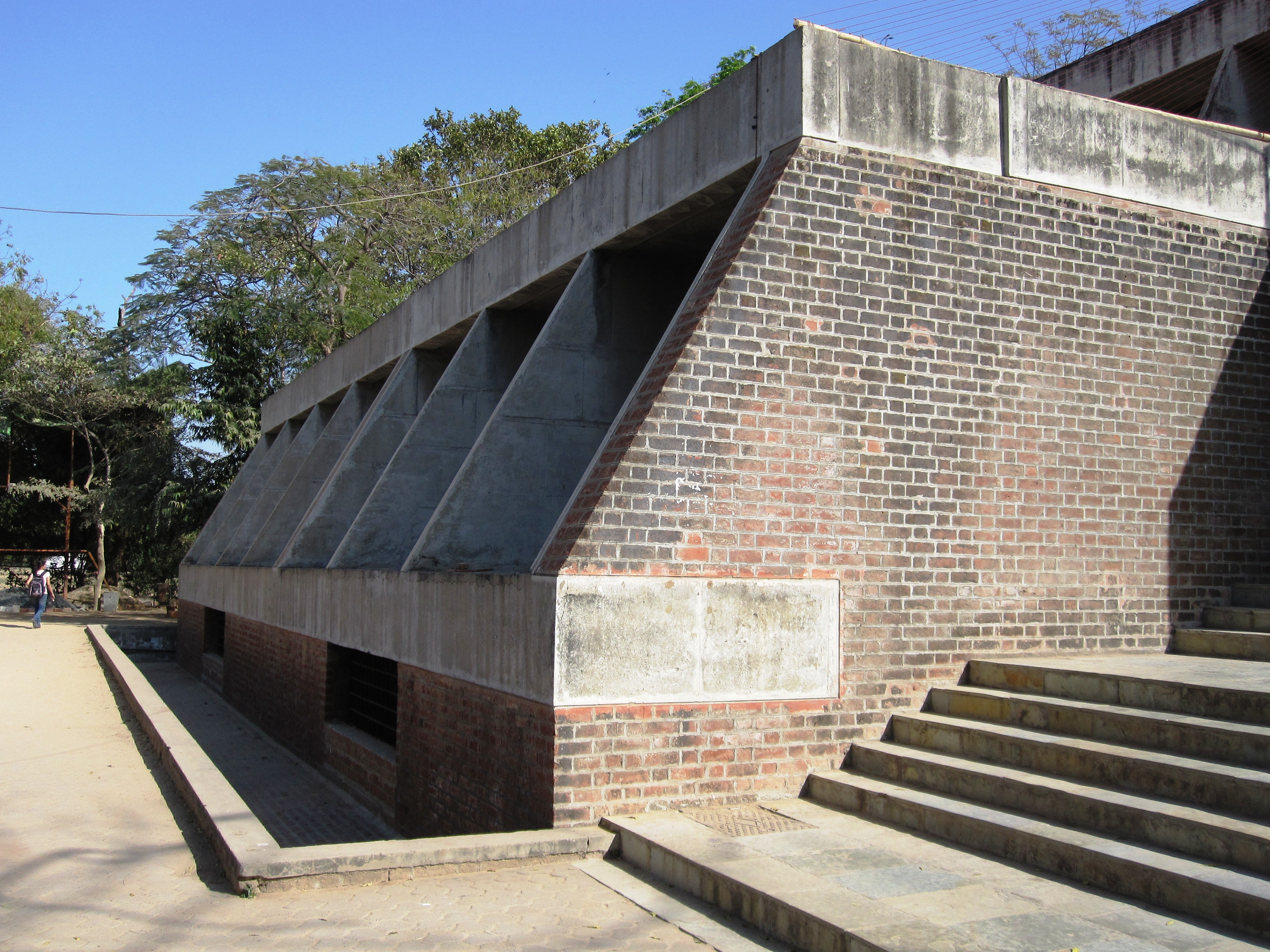

The Faculty of Technology, which concentrates on engineering and construction, was established in 1982 as the 'School of Building Science and Technology'.

=== Faculty of Design ===
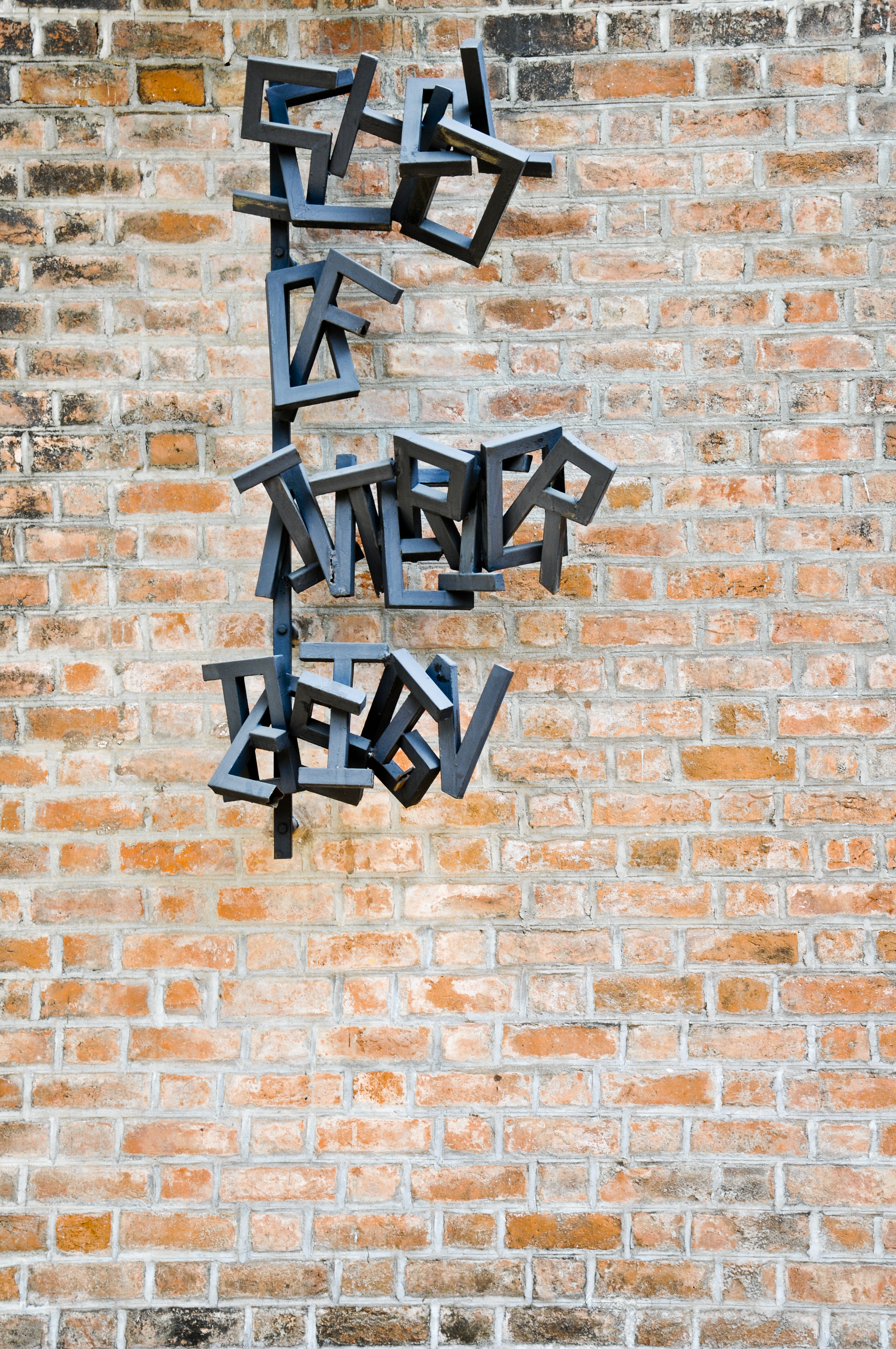
School of Interior Design

The Faculty of Design was established in 1991 as the 'School of Interior Design'. It deals with habitat related interiors, crafts, systems, and products. The Faculty of Design at CEPT proposes a contemporary design education to address various streams of knowledge and production in an evolving and ever-expanding discipline of design.

=== Faculty of Management ===
The Faculty of Management was established in 2008 and offered MBA in Technology Management. It was re-christened in 2013 and it now focuses on Habitat and Project Management.

== Centres of study ==
CEPT has established centres of study in the following areas:

- CEPT Research & Development Foundation (CRDF)
- Center for Urban Equity (CUE)
- Center for Advanced Research in Building Science & Energy (CARBSE)
- Design Innovation & Craft Resource Center (DICRC)
- Center for Excellence in Urban Transport (CoE)

== Ranking ==
The university was ranked 6th in India by the National Institutional Ranking Framework in the architecture ranking in 2024.

University rankings

Architecture – India
- NIRF (2024): 6

== Notable people ==
- B. V. Doshi - The founder Director of the School of Architecture, Ahmedabad (1962–1972), founder Director of the School of Planning (1972–1979), founder Dean of the Centre for Environmental Planning and Technology (1972–1981), founder member of the Visual Arts Centre, Ahmedabad and founder Director of the Kanoria Centre for Arts, Ahmedabad and the first Indian winner of Pritzker Prize.
- Christopher Benninger-The founder of the School of Planning, Ahmedabad, and Board Member (1972-2024)
- Rahul Mehrotra - Faculty of Architecture Alumni and Chair of the Department of Urban Planning and Design at the Harvard Graduate School of Design.
- Hasmukh Patel - an architect credited with making significant contributions to contemporary architecture in India, who was a Distinguished Professor and Dean Emeritus.
- Achal Bakeri - Faculty of Architecture alumni and an Indian entrepreneur and founder, chairman and managing director of Symphony Limited.
- Bimal Patel - Faculty of Architecture alumni, ex-President of CEPT University (2010-2023) and winner of Padma Shri award.
- Chitra Vishwanath - Faculty of Architecture alumni and an Indian architect based in Bengaluru who works on themes related to ecology and architecture.
- Emani Kumar - Faculty of Architecture alumni, environmentalist and a proponent of the concept of sustainable development.
- Arpan Shah - Faculty of Architecture alumni and an Indian architect based in Ahmedabad practising an inclusive architecture expressive of people, place and purpose.
