= Sambhaav =

Indian newspaper based in Ahmedabad, Gujarat

Sambhaav Metro

- Type: Daily newspaper
- Format: Tabloid
- Owner: Sambhaav Media Ltd.
- Publisher: Kiran Vadodaria
- Editor: Pragnesh Shukla
- Founded: 1986
- Language: Gujarati
- Headquarters: Ahmedabad, India
- Website: sambhaavmetro.in

Sambhaav Metro (Gujarati: સમભાવ મેટ્રો) is a Gujarati newspaper published six days a week (not on Sunday) only from Ahmedabad (Gujarat, India) Sambhaav, a broadsheet Gujarati newspaper when it started has modified into an afternoon tabloid Sambhaav Metro, focusing more on the news and happenings in and around, or related to Ahmedabad, India.

== Sambhaav Media ==
Sambhaav Metro operates under Sambhaav Media. Other business interests of Sabbhaav Media include radio station and Sambhaav Nascent, a joint venture for the provision of business news and online portals.

Sambhaav Media is publicly listed on the National Stock Exchange of India.
