= Anant Raje =

Indian architect and academic (1929–2009)

Anant Damodar Raje
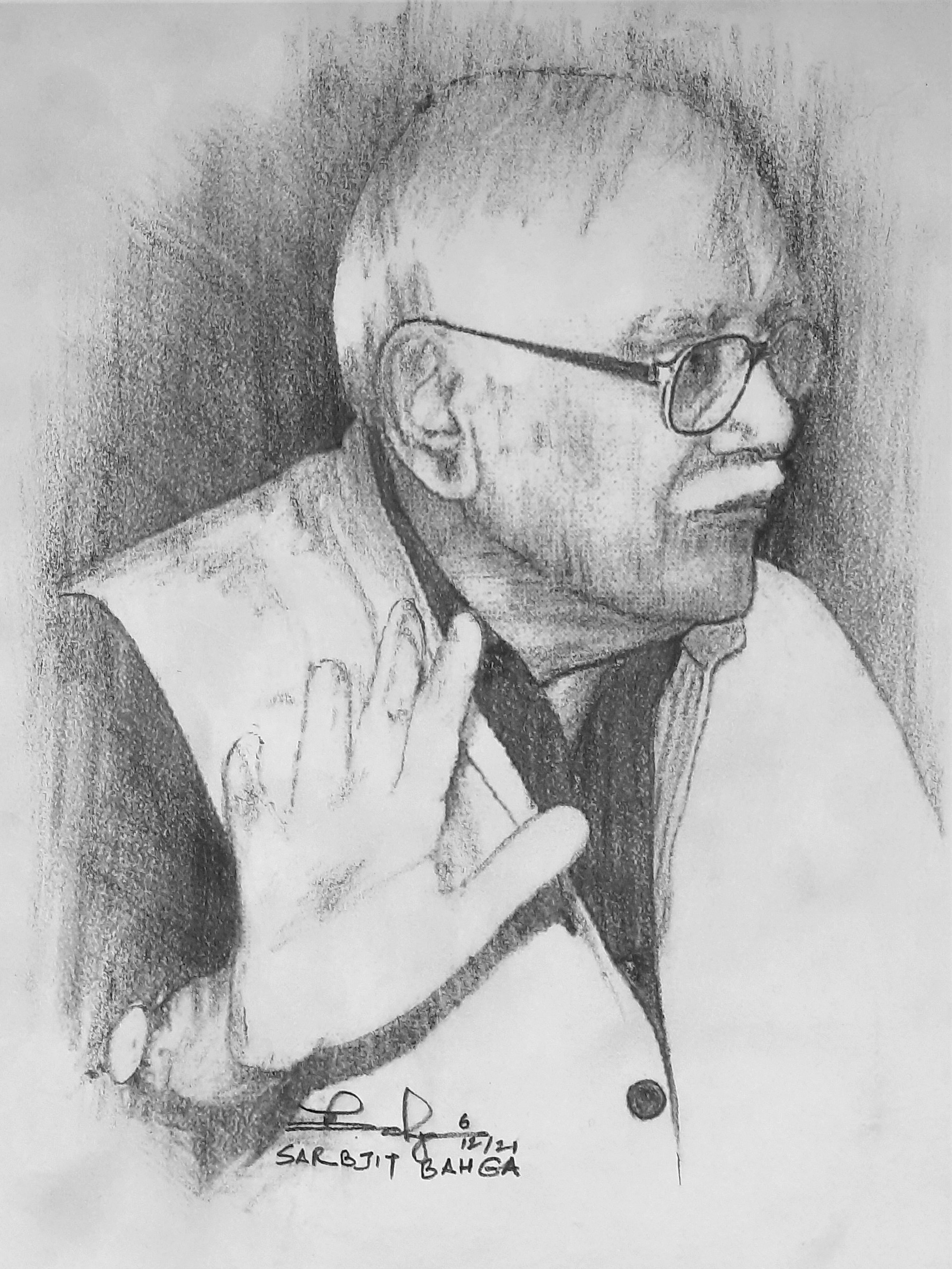
- Born: 17 September 1929; Mumbai
- Died: 27 June 2009 (aged 79)
- Education: Sir J. J. College of Architecture
- Occupation: Architect

Anant Damodar Raje (17 September 1929 – 27 June 2009) was an Indian architect and academic.

== Early life ==
Anant Raje was born in Mumbai, India. He graduated from the Sir J. J. College of Architecture in 1954.

== Career ==
He worked with Louis Kahn in Philadelphia, where he also taught at the University of Pennsylvania. As Kahn's student, he devoted his life to see the completion of the Indian Institute of Management, Ahmedabad, which Kahn did not live to see completed.

For over thirty years he has taught at the Faculty of Architecture, CEPT University, Ahmedabad. He also taught at the University of New Mexico, in The United States of America, and was a visiting professor at many universities in America and Europe.

== Major buildings ==
- Executive Management Centre at the Indian Institute of Management in Ahmedabad, India
- Indian Institute of Forest Management, Bhopal, India
- The Indian Statistical Institute in New Delhi.
- Museum Of Minerals, Nagpur (unbuilt)
- Galbabhai Farmers' Training Institute in Banaskantha, Gujarat
- MAFCO wholesale market, Mumbai, India

== Death ==
Raje died on 27 June 2009.
