= Entrepreneurship Development Institute of India =

Educational Institute in Ahmedabad

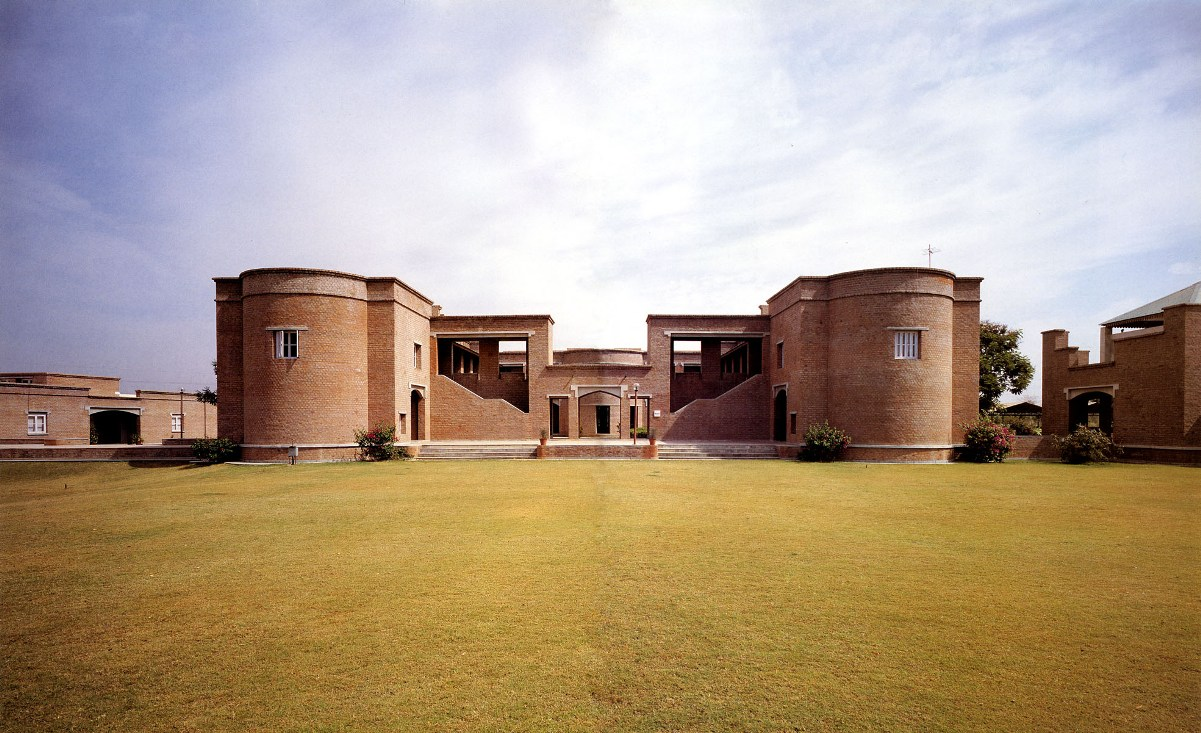
- Motto in English: The Goddess of wealth, Lakshmi comes to a man who is diligent like a lion
- Established: 1983
- Director: Sunil Shukla
- Location: Ahmedabad, Gujarat, India
- Campus: Urban
- Website: www.ediindia.org

The Entrepreneurship Development Institute of India (abbreviated as EDII) is an autonomous body and not-for-profit institute located in Ahmedabad, Gujarat, India. Established in 1983, the institute offers master's degree programmes in Entrepreneurship, a fellowship programme and a number of entrepreneurship training programmes. The Institute's founding director was V. G. Patel.

== History ==
EDII was established in 1983 with the active support of the Government of Gujarat, IDBI Bank, IFCI Ltd, ICICI Bank and State Bank of India. The 23 acres of land occupied by the institute was pledged by the Government of Gujarat. Its initial aim was to help potential and existing entrepreneurs and then gradually ventured to train trainers and faculty members. One of the major achievements of the EDII is inducing entrepreneurship in the curriculum of colleges, schools, science and technology institutions, and management schools in several states of the country and also setting up entrepreneurship development centers in 12 states across India.

== Academics ==
EDII offers a four-year full-time Fellow Program in Management (FPM) course, a two-year PGDM program in Business Entrepreneurship (PGDM-BE), and Development Studies (DS) with the intake of 120 seats in each discipline. PGDM-BE Program is approved by AICTE and Ministry of Human Resource Development (MHRD), Dept. of Higher Education, Govt. of India and Accredited by the National Board of Accreditation. EDII is honoured with AICTE Award for Supporting Start-Ups.

== Notable alumni and associates ==
- V. G. Patel
- Sailendra Narain
