= Symphony Limited =

Indian multinational electronics and Home appliances company

Symphony
- Company type: Public
- Traded as: BSE: 517385; NSE: SYMPHONY
- ISIN: INE225D01027
- Industry: Home appliances; Consumer electronics
- Founded: 1988; 38 years ago
- Founder: Achal Bakeri
- Headquarters: Ahmedabad, Gujarat, India
- Area served: Worldwide
- Products: Residential cooler, industrial cooler
- Number of employees: 400+
- Website: www.symphonylimited.com

Symphony Limited is an Indian multinational electronics and home appliances company, that specializes in manufacturing air coolers. It is based in Ahmedabad and was established in 1988. It is a public limited, listed company, with operations in about 60 countries.

== History ==
Initially incorporated as Sanskrut Comfort Systems Ltd. (SCS) in 1988 that manufactured consumer durables under brand name ‘Symphony’. Symphony went public in 1994 and was also listed at Bombay, Ahmedabad and Delhi stock exchanges.

In 1994, the company briefly diversified into the household electrical appliances sector in order to counter the seasonal nature of the air cooler business. Between 2002 and 2004, Symphony exited all other categories and resumed manufacturing only air coolers.

In 2006, Symphony acquired the Mexican assets of the International Metal Products Company (IMPCO) for $650,000. IMPCO's large commercial air coolers were deployed in India in 2010.

In 2015, Symphony acquired Chinese air cooler company Munters Keruilai Air Treatment Equipment (Guangdong) Co. Ltd. (MKE) that owns the brand Keruilai, for ₹1.5 crore.

In 2018, Symphony purchased 95% equity stake in Climate Technologies, an Australian manufacturer of cooling and heating products, at a valuation range of A$40–44 million.

== Operations ==
About 25-30 percent of Symphony's turnover comes from international markets of Mexico, Europe, United States, West Asia and South-East Asia.
