= Paldi (Ahmedabad) =

- Neighbourhood
- Location in Ahmedabad, Gujarat, India Paldi (Gujarat) Paldi (India)
- Coordinates: 23°0′22″N 72°33′53″E
- Country: India
- State: Gujarat
- District: Ahmedabad

Government
  - Body: Ahmedabad Municipal Corporation

Languages
  - Official: Gujarati, Hindi
- Time zone: UTC+5:30 (IST)
- PIN: 380007
- Telephone code: 91-079
- Vehicle registration: GJ
- Lok Sabha constituency: Ahmedabad West
- Vidhan Sabha constituency: Ellisbridge
- Civic agency: Ahmedabad Municipal Corporation
- Website: gujaratindia.com

Paldi is an area located in South Western Ahmedabad, India. Corporate offices and city centres of many national and international companies like ICICI Bank, Royal Bank of Scotland, Religare, Claris, Gujarat Gas are located within Paldi. It accommodates Sanskar Kendra museum by the renowned architect Le Corbusier as well as Tagore Memorial Hall. The National Institute of Design is located in Paldi. M K Gandhi's first ashram in India, Kochrab Ashram is also located in Paldi. This area has many houses of the Art Deco period.

== Education ==
- National Institute of Design

== Hospitals ==
- AIMS Hospital

== Transportation ==
- Ahmedabad Railway Station is approximately 7 km from Paldi.
- Gujarat State Road Transport Corporation Bus Station, Gita Mandir is approximately 2 km from Paldi.
- Sardar Vallabhbhai Patel International Airport is approximately 16 km from Paldi.
