= Hasmukh Patel (architect) =

Indian architect (1933–2018)

Hasmukh Chandulal Patel
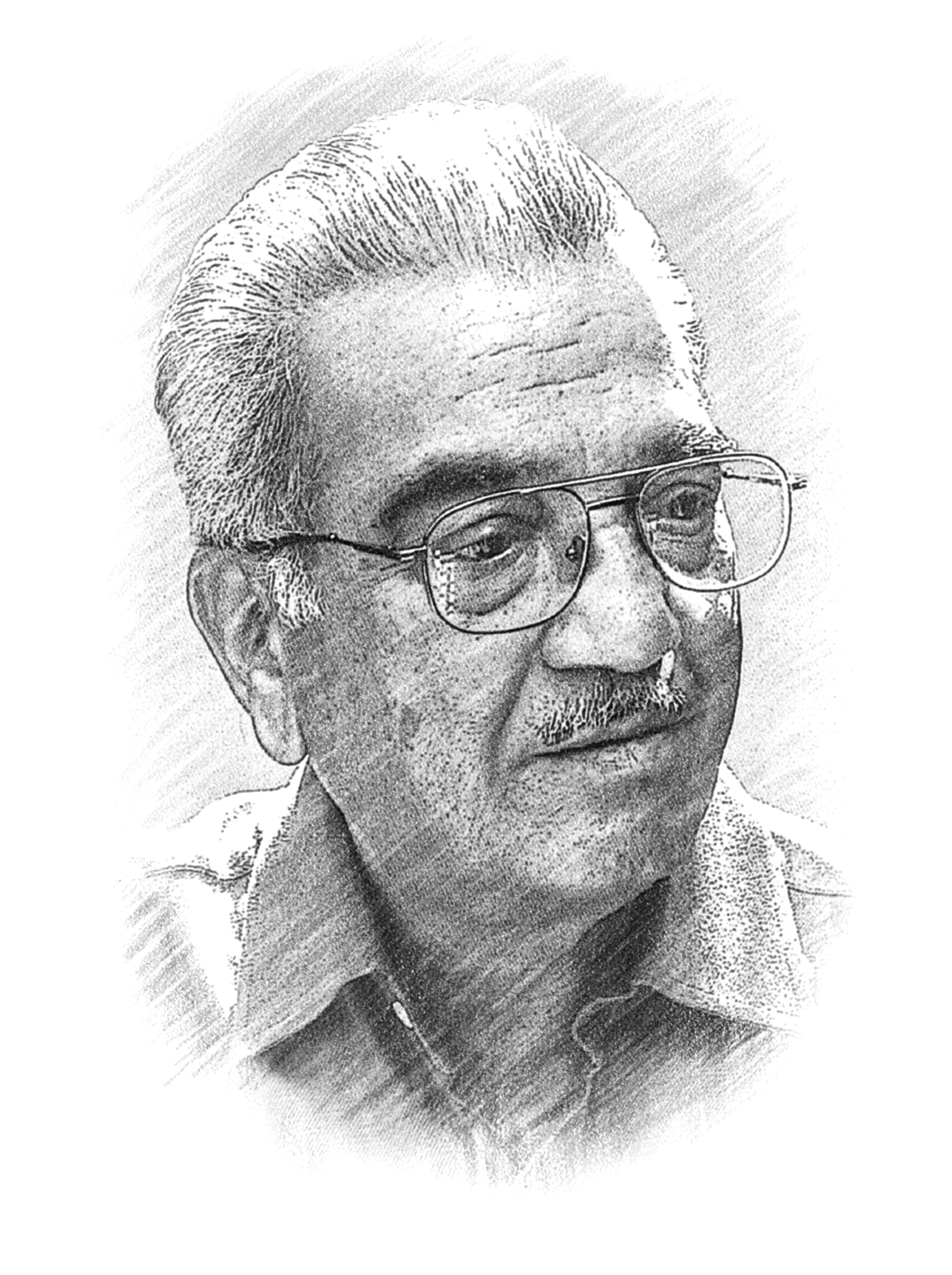
- Born: 7 December 1933; Bhadran, Gujarat, India
- Died: 20 January 2018 (aged 84); Ahmedabad, Gujarat, India
- Education: Cornell University, Ithaca, New York; Maharaja Sayajirao University of Baroda
- Occupations: Architect, educator
- Children: Bimal Patel (son); Canna Patel (daughter)
- Practice: www.hcp.co.in

Hasmukh Chandulal Patel (7 December 1933 – 20 January 2018) was an architect credited with making significant contributions to contemporary architecture in India in a career spanning over four decades in the latter half of 20th century. His works are held in high-regard alongside those of prominent Indian architects in the post-independence era like Achyut Kanvinde, Charles Correa, Anant Raje, B.V. Doshi and others.

Patel was the founder of the Ahmedabad based architecture firm HCP Design Planning and Management Pvt Ltd. He was also a part of the small group of architects who nurtured the School of Architecture, CEPT (now CEPT University). He was its Honorary Director from 1972 to 1980 and Dean from 1976 to 1983. During this period CEPT consolidated its position as a premier institution.

== Biography ==
Hasmukh C. Patel was born in Bhadran, a small village of Gujarat. He lived in Vadodara with his father Chandubhai Rambhai Patel, mother Shantaben and grew up with five siblings. His father was an engineer who ran a small construction business and Patel would often visit the sites that he was working on. After high school, he pursued a bachelor's degree in architecture at Maharaja Sayajirao University of Baroda and graduated in 1956. He left India to study further at Cornell University, Ithaca, New York and graduated with a master's degree in architecture in 1959. He traveled extensively in Europe and Africa before returning to India and joined the architectural firm of Atmaram Gajjar in Ahmedabad.

Shortly after that in 1961, Patel started his own practice under the name of M/s Hasmukh C. Patel, now known as HCP Design Planning and Management. His first office was in the old city of Ahmedabad. Through the 1970s and ’80s, Patel's practice grew rapidly and moved to bigger offices, making it possible for him to have a setup with facilities and a layout that fully supported the working style that he believed in. In 1988, the practice shifted to Paritosh in Usmanpura, Ahmedabad, a building built by him, which houses the practice till date.

Patel's practice gave Ahmedabad some iconic buildings that dot the city's skyline. His work covered a diverse range of projects — townships, industrial units, hotels, hospitals, housing, public buildings, commercial complexes, academic institutes, cinemas and sports facilities. In a career spanning four decades, he designed 300 buildings, including landmarks such as the Patang Hotel, Reserve Bank of India, Refurbishment of Eden Gardens Stadium (Kolkata) and Centre Point Apartments. He demonstrated that the speculative model could be used to make profitable buildings which would be an architectural asset to the city. Patel was also a key figure in reviving interest and mobilizing support for the Sabarmati Riverfront Development Project in 1970s and for constituting RFDG (Riverfront Development Group) that consisted of local private architecture businesses.

He was a distinguished professor and Dean Emeritus at CEPT University. He was a visiting professor at the University of British Columbia, Vancouver and the University of Bristol. His work has been featured in numerous journals and books across the globe including India, UK, US, France, and Italy. He was married to Bhakti Patel and they have two children — architect-planner Bimal Patel who leads HCP Design, Planning & Management Pvt. Ltd and architect Canna Patel who leads HCP Interior Architecture Pvt. Ltd.

== Selected projects ==
- 1963: Newman Hall (Premal Jyoti), Ahmedabad
- 1964: State Bank of India, Ahmedabad
- 1966: Diwan Ballubhai School, Ahmedabad
- 1967: Medical and Social Welfare Centre, Mokasan
- 1967: St. Xavier's Primary School, Ahmedabad
- 1968: St. Xavier's Technical Institute, Vadodara
- 1969: Church at Cambay (Khambhat)
- 1969: Usha Theatre, Rajkot
- 1971: Reserve Bank of India, Ahmedabad
- 1974: Bhaikaka Bhavan, Ahmedabad
- 1974: Dena Bank, Ahmedabad
- 1975: Reading Centre, Gujarat University, Ahmedabad
- 1976: Central Laboratory, Gujarat University, Ahmedabad
- 1976: HK House, Ahmedabad
- 1977: Carmel Convent Hostel, Gandhinagar
- 1977: Sardar Patel Institute Hostel, Ahmedabad
- 1978: Chinubhai Centre and Patang Hotel, Ahmedabad
- 1979: St. Xavier's High School, Gandhinagar
- 1979: Shyamal Row Houses, Ahmedabad
- 1981: Centre Point Apartments, Ahmedabad
- 1984: Gujarat Tourism Bhavan, Gandhinagar (Proposed)
- 1984: Maitry Row Houses, Surat
- 1985: Paritosh Building, Ahmedabad
- 1986: Refurbishment of Eden Gardens Stadium, 1987, Kolkata
- 1993: International Stadium, Cochin (Proposed)

== Awards ==
- 1998: Baburao Mhatre Gold Medal for Life Time Achievement, Indian Institute of Architects
- 2000: Great Master's Award by J. K. Cement for his contribution to architectural profession
- 2011: Lifetime Achievement Award, Architects and Interiors India Awards
