= Patang Hotel =

Hotel in Gujarat

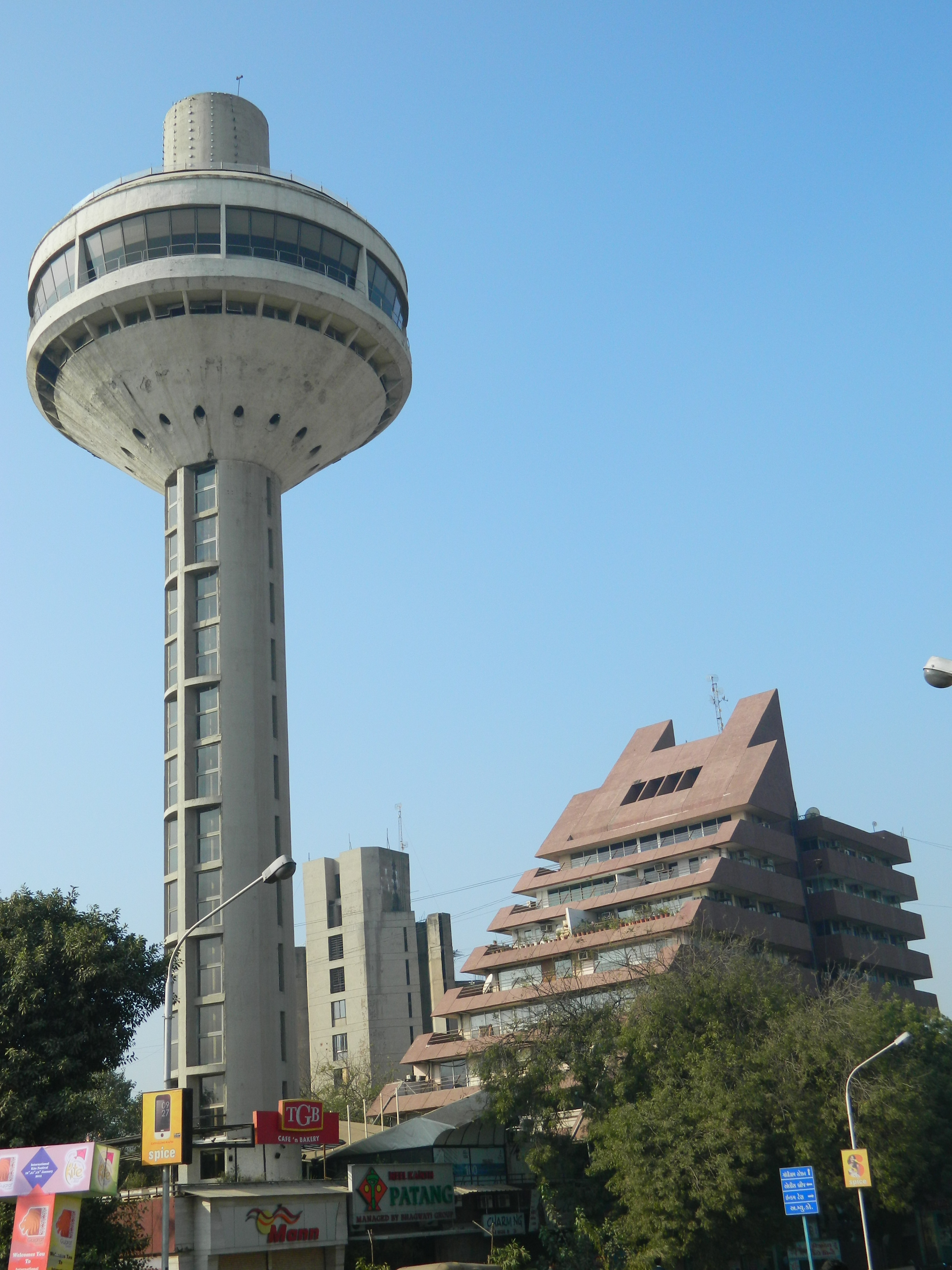

- Location within Gujarat

Restaurant information
- Established: 1984
- Closed: 1990s, 2001-07, 2019-23
- Owner: Dharmadev Group
- Head chef: Ajay Chopra
- Location: Nehru Bridge, Ahmedabad, Gujarat, 380009, India
- Coordinates: 23°01′35.0″N 72°34′19.8″E
- Seating capacity: 110
- Reservations: Yes
- Height: 221 feet (67 m)
- Website: patanghotel.com

Patang Hotel, also known as Patang Re-Evolve, is a revolving restaurant located at Nehru Bridge corner on Ashram Road in Ahmedabad, Gujarat, India. Built in 1980–1984, 221 feet (67 m) above the ground, it is considered as the landmark of Ahmedabad.

== History ==
The restaurant is named Patang, literally a "fighter kite" in Gujarati language. It was designed by an architect Hasmukh Patel. The restaurant and the adjoining Chinubhai Centre, a commercial complex, were built in 1980–1984 at a cost of approximately ₹1.25 crore (equivalent to ₹20 crore or US$2.0 million in 2023).

It was closed in 1990s and also in early 2000s following 2001 Bhuj earthquake. It was purchased by Dharmadev Group and operated from 2007 to 2019. It was closed from 2019 to 2023 due to COVID-19 pandemic and renovation which cost ₹12 crore (US$1.2 million). It was reopened on 24 October 2023 with new interiors and exteriors. Another terrace and garden restaurants were built at the additional cost of ₹10 crore (US$1.0 million).

== Architecture and services ==
The design was inspired by Chabutaro, a traditional tower-like structure where the birds are fed. According the 2018 Limca book of Records, it was the first revolving restaurant at 221 feet (67 m) above the ground level in India. It completes a 360 degree revolution in 90 minutes. It is located near the Sabarmati Riverfront on the bank of Sabarmati River which enables the view of old and new city of Ahmedabad for the visitors. It has a garden restaurant at base as well as revolving and terrace restaurants at the top.

It has a capacity of 110 people. It is a buffet restaurant serving vegetarian dishes of Indian, Mexican and Chinese origin. It is also considered as a tourist attraction.

Despite being one of the most iconic hotels of Ahmedabad, it is often criticized for its poor service and below par food quality.

== Gallery ==
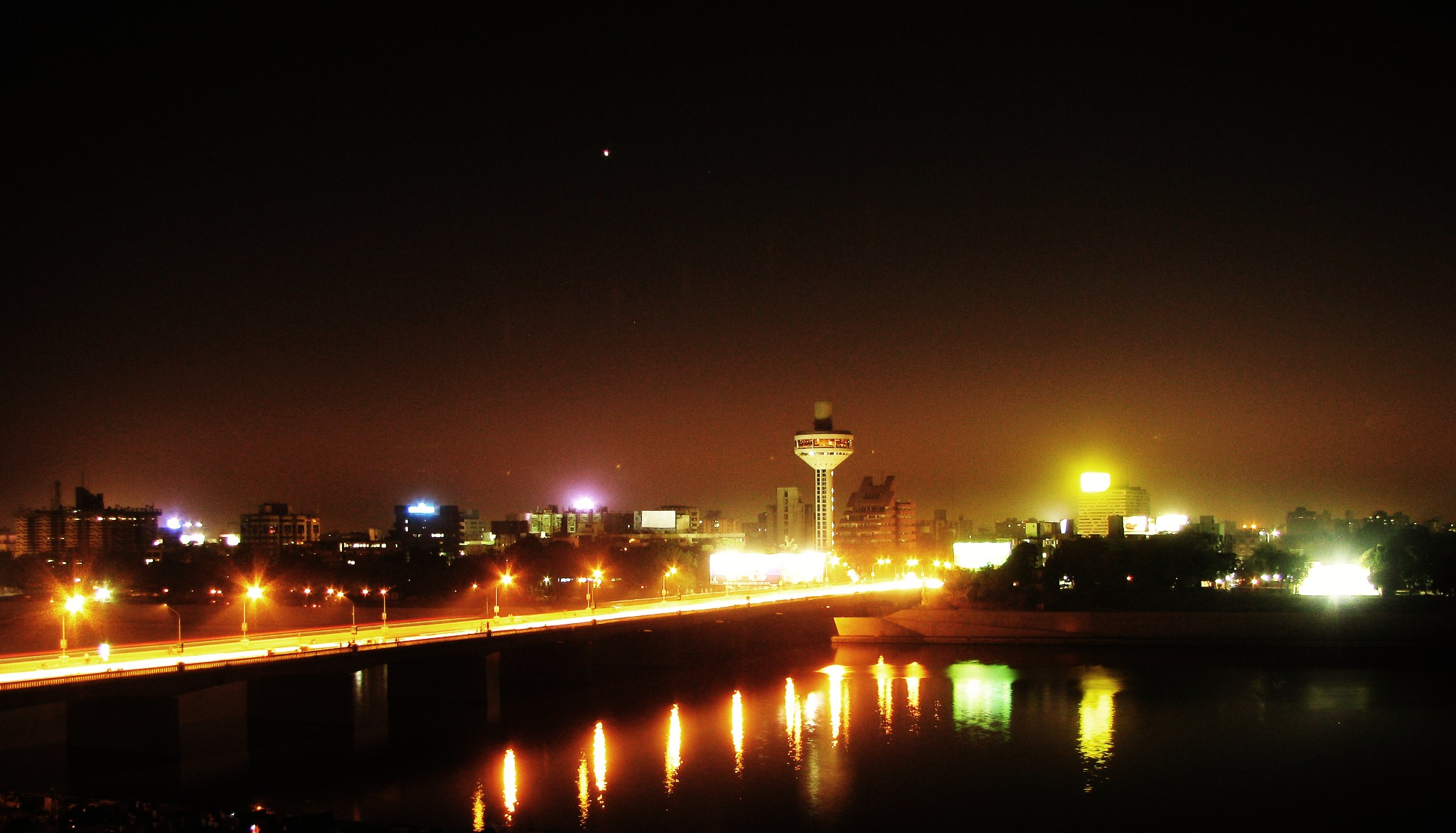
Patang visible from Sabarmati river

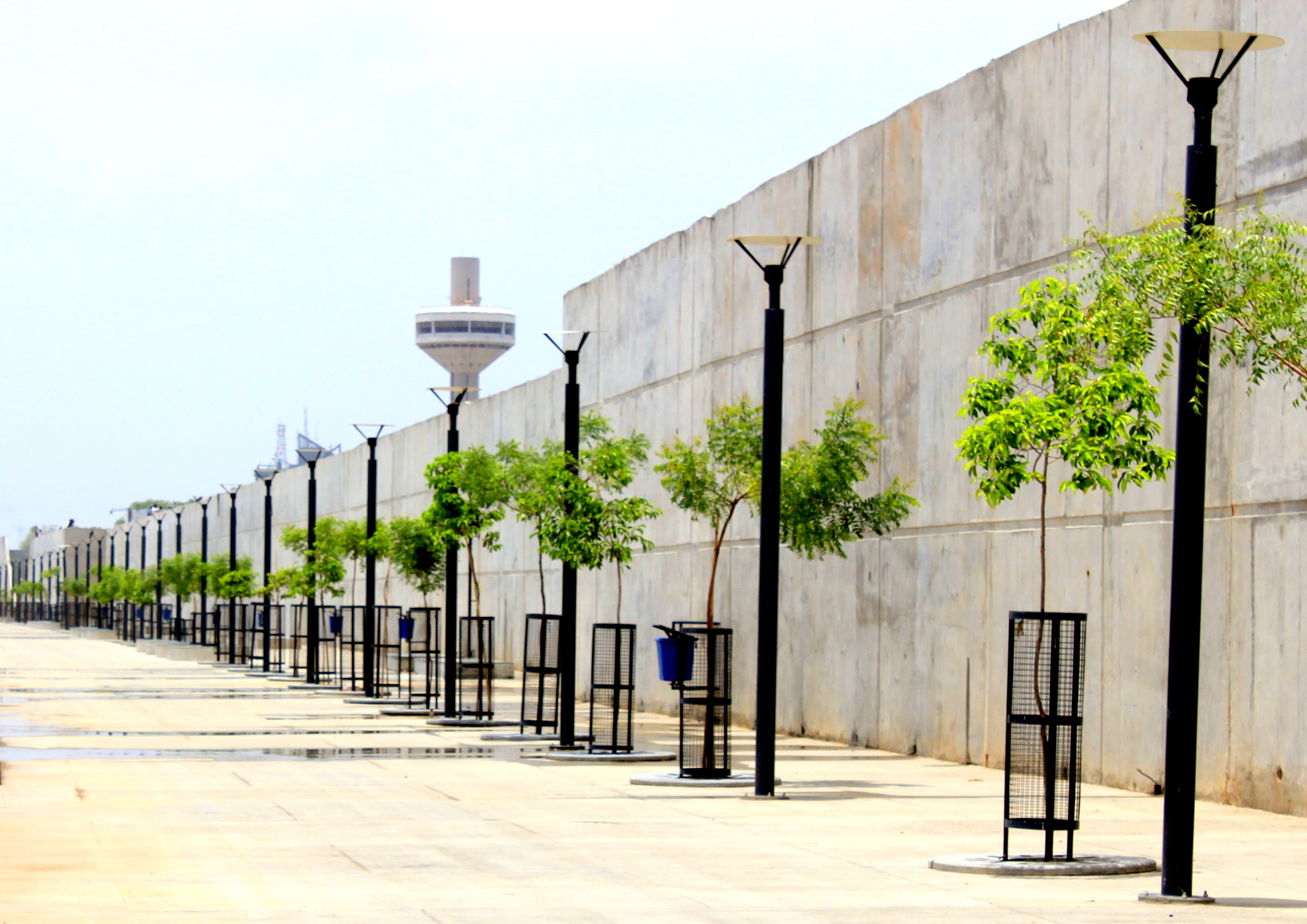
Patang visible from Sabarmati Riverfront

== See also ==
- List of revolving restaurants
