= Paranur railway station =

Railway station in Tamil Nadu, India

Paranur
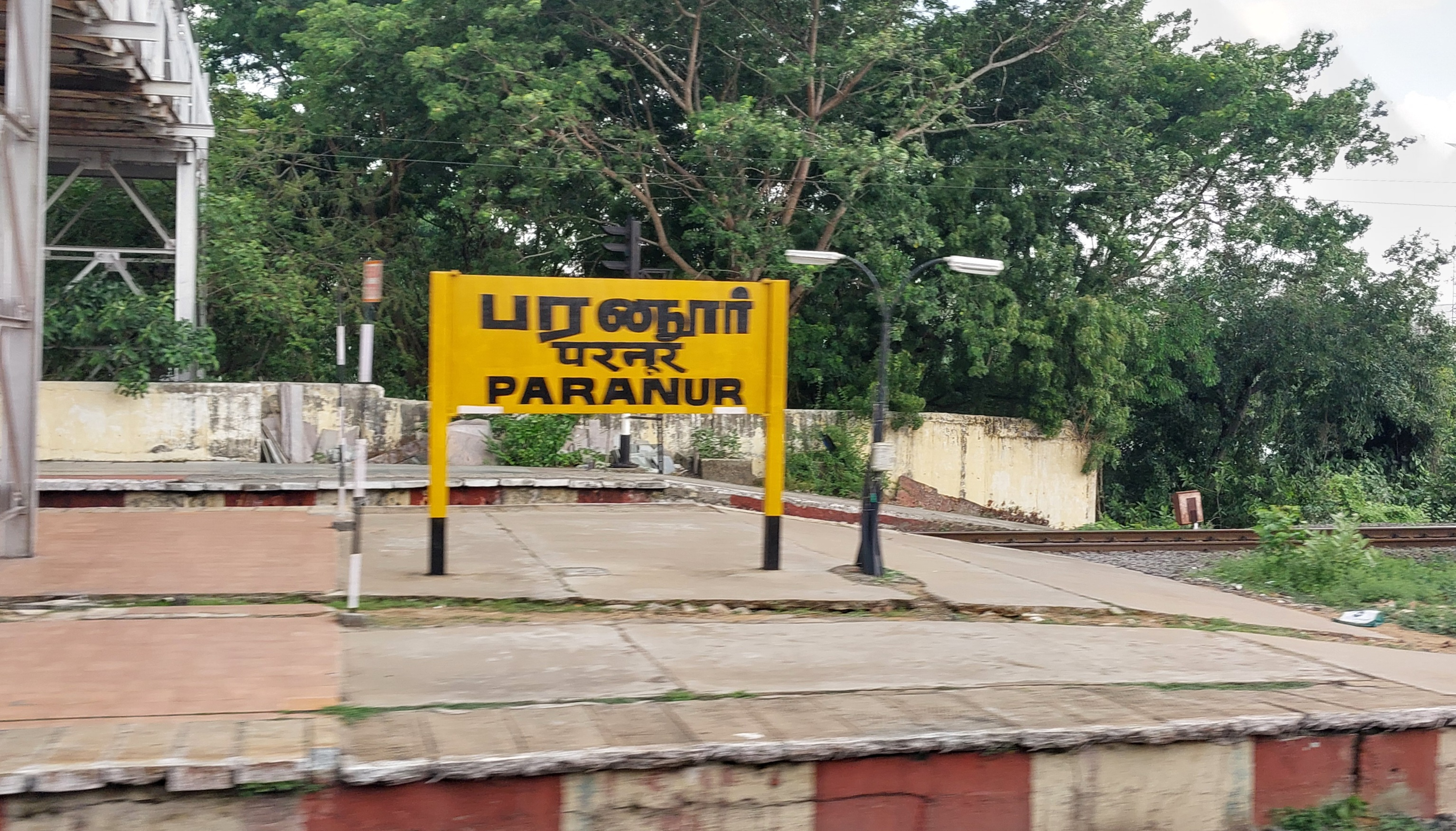
- Paranur railway station platform

General information
- Location: GST Road, Paranur, Kanchipuram district, Tamil Nadu; India
- Coordinates: 12°43′51″N 79°59′2″E
- System: Indian Railways and Chennai Suburban Railway station
- Owner: Ministry of Railways, Indian Railways

Construction
- Structure type: Standard on-ground station
- Parking: Available

Other information
- Station code: PWU
- Fare zone: Southern Railways

History
- Electrified: 1965
- Former names: South Indian Railway

Services
Preceding station	Chennai Suburban	Following station
Singaperumal Koil towards Tambaram or Chennai Beach	South Line	Chengalpattu Junction towards Chengalpattu Junction or Villupuram Junction
Route map
Chennai Beach — Villupuram
Location

Paranur railway station is one of the railway stations of the Chennai Beach–Chengalpattu section of the Chennai Suburban Railway Network. It is situated at a distance of 55 km south of Chennai Beach terminus and has an elevation of 42 m above sea level. It serves the neighbourhood of Paranur and the Mahindra World City at New Chennai.

The station is noted for its maintenance by a public–private partnership between Mahindra World City Developers (MWCD) and the Indian Railways, reportedly the first of its kind in the country. MWCD gave the station a makeover after Mahindra World City, an integrated business zone, was developed in the neighbourhood.

== History ==
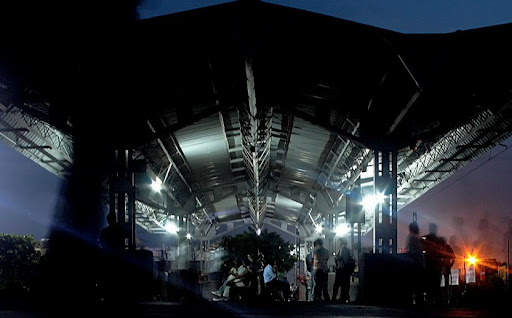
View of the passenger shelter at the platform

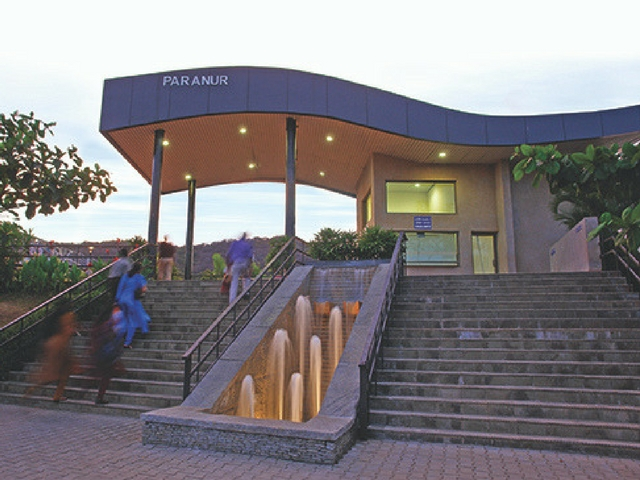
Entrance to the station

The lines at the station were electrified on 9 January 1965. On 15 January 1967, all the lines were converted to 25 kV AC.

== The station ==
MWCD developed the station at a cost of ₹ 15 million. It also maintains the station. The project includes building and maintenance of the main structure including the ticket counter, waiting room and toilets, fountains, platforms, foot over-bridge, and landscaped stretches of land around the station and near the tracks.

The station was designed by Sheila Sri Prakash of Shilpa Architects.

=== Platforms ===
There are a total of 3 platforms and 3 tracks. The platforms are connected by foot overbridge. These platforms are built to accumulate 24 coaches express train. The platforms are equipped with modern facility like display board of arrival and departure of trains.

=== Station layout ===
G	Street level	Exit/Entrance & ticket counter
P	FOB, Side platform | Doors will open on the left
P	Platform 3	Towards → Tambaram / Chennai Beach; Next Station: Singaperumal Koil
P	Platform 2	Towards → Tambaram / Chennai Beach
P	FOB, Island platform | P1 Doors will open on the left | P1 & P2 - (Express Lines)
P	Platform 1	Towards ← Chengalpattu Jn / Villuppuram Jn; Next Station: Chengalpattu Junction
P	FOB, Side platform | P1 Doors will open on the left
G	Street level	Exit/Entrance & ticket counter

== Traffic ==
The station serves around 20,000 commuters every day. About 40 percent of MWCD's workforce uses the station.

== See also ==
- Railway stations in Chennai
- Chennai Suburban Railway
