= Anumolu Ramakrishna =

Indian civil and structural engineer and corporate executive

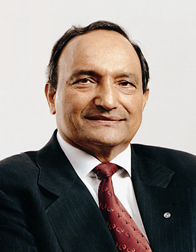
- Born: 20 December 1939; Punadipadu, Krishna district, Madras Presidency, British India
- Died: 20 August 2013 (aged 73)
- Education: College of Engineering, Guindy
- Occupations: Engineer; Corporate executive
- Years active: 1962–2013
- Known for: Larsen & Toubro; Construction technology
- Awards: Padma Bhushan; ICI-Fosroc Award; Davidson Frame Award; Eminent Engineering Personality Award; Prestressed Concrete Design Award; Hassib Sabbagh Award

Anumolu Ramakrishna (20 December 1939 – 20 August 2013) was an Indian civil and structural engineer, corporate executive and the deputy managing director of Larsen & Toubro Construction, the largest construction company in India as per 2013 statistics. He was credited with the introduction of system formwork and precast and prestressed concrete technologies in Indian construction industry, procedures which helped increase productivity, and was a co-founder of the India chapter of FSL - Global Forum on Structural Longevity. The Government of India awarded him the third highest civilian honour of the Padma Bhushan, posthumously in 2014, for his contributions to science and technology.

== Biography ==
Born on 20 December 1939 in Punadipadu, a small village near Vijayawada in Krishna district, in the south Indian state of Andhra Pradesh, Ramakrishna graduated in Civil Engineering from Andhra University and secured a master's degree (MSc) in Structural Engineering from the College of Engineering, Guindy of Madras University. His career started at the construction division of Larsen & Toubro, then known as Engineering Construction Corporation Limited, in 1962 but continued his education by undergoing advanced training in structural engineering in the former German Democratic Republic in 1966, after obtaining a sponsorship from the Government of India. He served L&T for 42 years during which time, he held various positions such as that of a member of the Board of Directors (1992), President (Operations) of ECC Construction Division (1995) and the Deputy Managing Director (2000). By the time he retired from L&T service in 2004, the revenue of the construction division reportedly grew from ₹4.5 billion to over ₹55 billion (2004), registering a 40 percent growth in volume of business.

Ramakrishna, who oversaw the construction of several major projects in India such as cement and steel plants, refineries and petrochemical complexes, seaports, airports and nuclear power plants, served as a director board member of many corporate entities; Ramco Industries, TAJGVK Hotels & Resorts, Ramco Cements, Andhra Petrochemicals, Andhra Sugars, Jaipur-Kishangarh Expressway, Mumbai International Airport Limited, UltraTech Cement and Brigade Group are some of the notable ones among them. Among the honors he received, ICI-Fosroc Award for Outstanding Concrete Technologist (1993), Institution of Engineers (India) Prestressed Concrete Design Award (1995), Eminent Engineering Personality award (1998) and World Federation of Engineering Organizations Hassib Sabbagh Award (2007) were for technological excellence and Outstanding Contribution to Construction Industry Award of Builders’ Association of India (1993), Davidson Frame Award (1997), Rotary International Outstanding efforts in Business Ethics award (2000) and Rotary International For the Sake of Honour’ Award (2001) were for excellence in corporate management. His alma mater, Andhra University, conferred the honoris causa degree of Doctor of Science on him in 1997 and he received another honorary degree, Doctor of Philosophy, from Jawaharlal Nehru Technological University in 2004.

He died on 20 August 2013, succumbing to a cardiac arrest, at the age of 73.

The Government of India awarded him the civilian honor of the Padma Bhushan posthumously in 2014.

== See also ==
- Satya N. Atluri
