= World city (disambiguation) =

A world city is a city deemed to be an important node point in the global economic system.

World city may also refer to:

- Ecumenopolis, the hypothetical concept of a planetwide city
- Great World City, a building complex in Singapore
- Mahindra World City, special economic zones in India

== See also ==
- List of largest cities
