= Shilpa Architects =

Indian architecture firm

- Official logo

Practice information
- Key architects: Sheila Sri Prakash; Pavitra Sri Prakash
- Founded: 1979

Significant works and honors
- Buildings: Cholamandal Artists' Village; Mahindra World City, New Chennai
- Awards: 2003 DesignShare; 2002 Builder's Association of India

Shilpa Architects is an international architecture, design and planning firm that was founded in 1979 in Chennai, India by Sheila Sri Prakash. The firm was established as a proprietary firm and is the first architecture firm that was founded independently by a woman in India.

It currently operates offices in Chennai, Bangalore and Mumbai, in India and in New York City and Chicago in the United States and provides urban design and master planning services. The firm's designs can be seen at Cholamandal Artists' Village, Mahindra World City, New Chennai, Paranur on GST Road and it is known for its work inspired by sustainable vernacular architectural practices as well as a sensitivity for society and the built-natural environment.

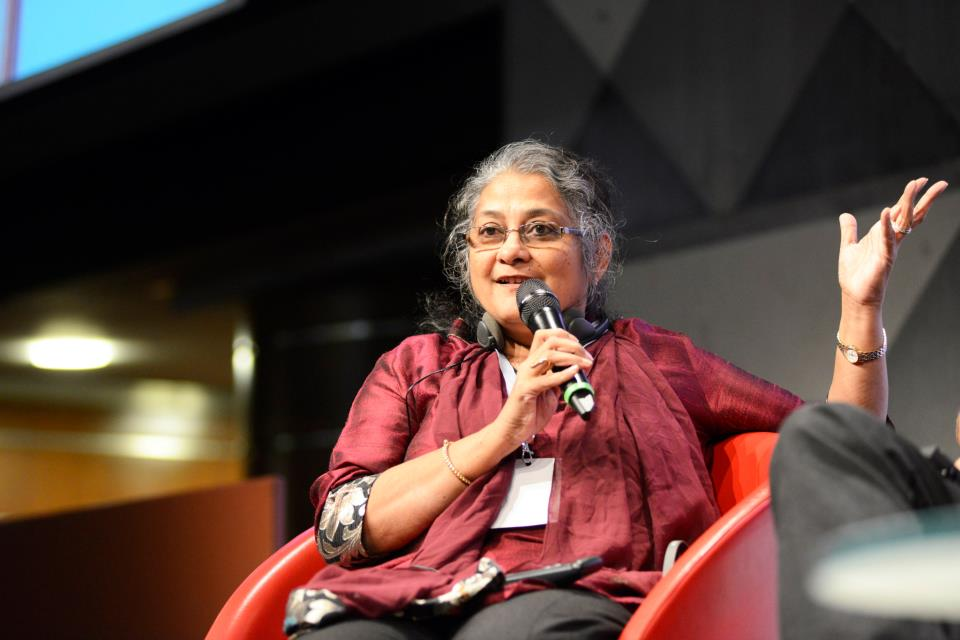
Sheila Sri Prakash is founder of Shilpa Architects

Sheila Sri Prakash currently serves on the World Economic Forum's Global Agenda Council on Design Innovation, as one of 16 leading experts from around the world that have been called upon to devise plans to improve the state of the world. She received her architectural degree from the Anna University School of Architecture and Planning in Chennai and completed an Executive Education program at the Harvard Graduate School of Design. She was also an International Fellow of Architecture at Ball State University in Muncie Indiana for her scholarly work on Indian Art, Architecture and Vaastu : The Indian Art of placement or Vastu Shastra. Since its inception, the company has grown to over 80 professionals and has operations across India and in the USA. The firm's designers have been invited to speak at several national and international forums such as the Confederation of Indian Industry.

Shilpa Architects was instrumental in the institution of the Indian Green Building Council and continues to remain a member of that organization. The firm is known for low-cost, durable, mass-construction techniques. In 1987 - the year of "Shelter for the shelterless" by the Shelter programme in Tamil Nadu state, the firm was invited by the Tamil Nadu Slum Clearance Board, Madras Metropolitan Development Authority and the World Bank to prototype a model that has since been adopted successfully in a large-scale format across Tamil Nadu and India. Sheila Sri Prakash holds patents for innovative designs in structural and architectural elements for low cost yet improved quality of construction.

In 2003, Designshare awarded Shilpa Architects a Recognized Value Award for its innovative design for educational infrastructure.

In 2008, the firm received the IAD Award.

== Projects ==
Shilpa Architects has recently been called upon to restore some of India's archaeological treasures as one of the country's select few experts in architecture, design, restoration and preservation by the Archaeological Survey of India.

== Expansion ==
The firm has diversified with subsidiaries in the investment & asset management space - through Nirmana Investments Pvt Ltd which was founded by Bhargav Sri Prakash - and in turn-key interior fit out solutions - through Stone Lotus - and delivers architectural designs internationally through an overseas subsidiary.

Pavithra Sri Prakash has recently been inducted into the Board of the company and is an Architect and Urban Designer by profession. She received her undergraduate degree in Architecture from the Anna University School of Architecture and Planning in Chennai and completed her graduate degree in Architecture and Urban Design from Columbia University in New York.

The company recently inducted Amrit Sahasranamam as the Chief Financial Officer. Amrit Sahasranamam has an undergraduate degree in Computer Science from the Illinois Institute of Technology and a Master of Business Administration from the University of Chicago.

=== Reciprocity Wave ===
The Reciprocity Wave, a program conceived by Sheila Sri Prakash, is a sculpture competition where students create art work with recycled materials to highlight social and environmental issues. Shilpa Architects have conducted three such initiatives, two in Chennai, and one in Bangalore. and one in Cubbon Park, Bangalore.

== See also ==
- List of architecture firms
- List of architects
- List of Indian architects
