= Pierre Jeanneret =

Swiss architect (1896–1967)

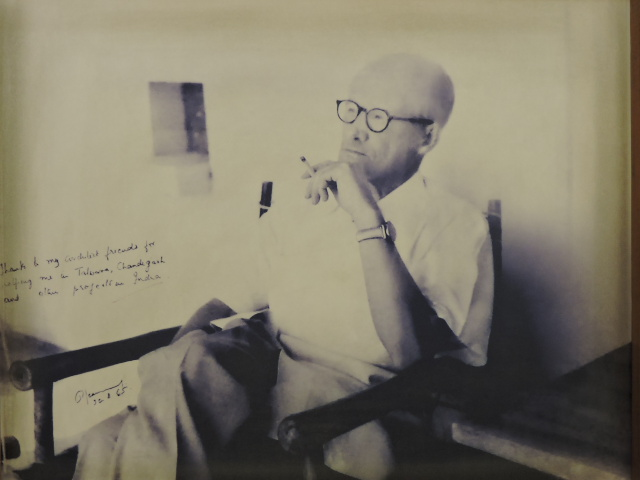
- Born: Arnold-André-Pierre Jeanneret-Gris; 22 March 1896; Geneva, Switzerland
- Died: 4 December 1967 (aged 71)
- Occupation: Architect
- Buildings: Gandhi Bhawan, Chandigarh
- Projects: Chandigarh's huge civic architecture project

Pierre Jeanneret (French pronunciation: [pjɛʁ ʒanʁɛ]; 22 March 1896 – 4 December 1967) was a Swiss architect who collaborated with his cousin, Charles-Édouard Jeanneret (who assumed the pseudonym Le Corbusier), for about twenty years.

== Early life ==
Arnold-André-Pierre Jeanneret-Gris was born in Geneva. He grew up in the typical Jura landscape that influenced his early childhood and his Geneva Calvinism roots. He attended the School of Fine Arts (Ecole des Beaux-Arts, Geneva). As a young student, he was a brilliant painter, artist and architect, greatly influenced by Charles-Édouard Jeanneret (Le Corbusier), his cousin and mentor for life. He was a cyclist in the Swiss Army from 1916 to 1918.

== Career ==
In 1922, the Jeanneret cousins set up an architectural practice together. From 1927 to 1937 they worked together with Charlotte Perriand at the Le Corbusier-Pierre Jeanneret studio, rue de Sèvres. In 1929 the trio prepared the "House Fittings" section for the Decorative Artists Exhibition and asked for a group stand, renewing and widening the 1928 avant-garde group idea. This was refused by the Decorative Artists Committee. They resigned and founded the Union of Modern Artists ("Union des artistes modernes": UAM).

The cousins later designed many buildings, including a number of villas and vacation houses, and renovated existing buildings as well.

Their working relationship ended when Pierre joined the French Resistance and Le Corbusier worked with the Vichy Government, a collaborationist regime to Nazi Germany. They collaborated once again after the War, on the plan and architecture for the New town of Chandigarh in India.

Pierre Jeanneret in conversation with Le Corbusier at the Architect's Office (now Le Corbusier Centre) in Chandigarh

== Chandigarh ==
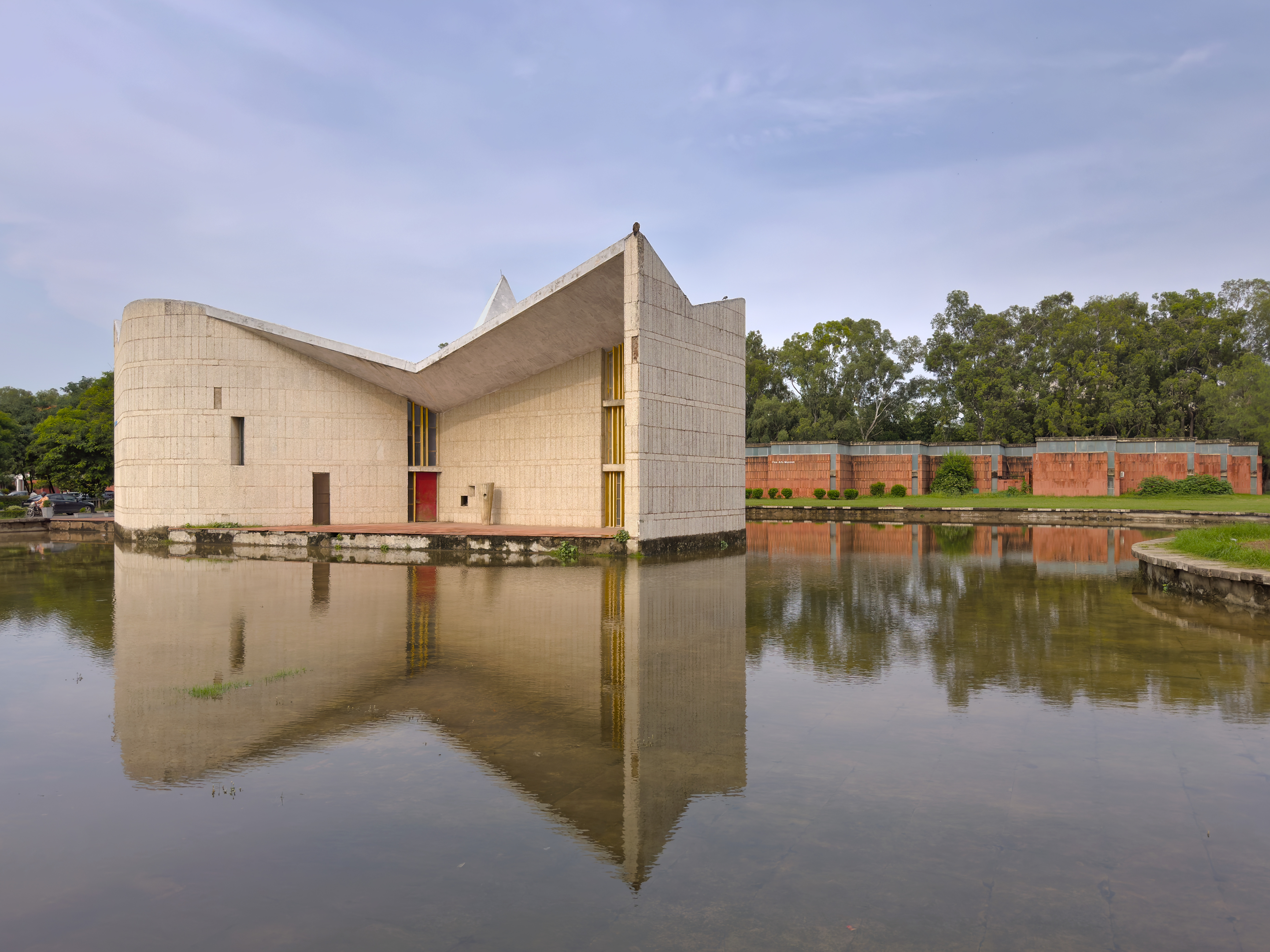
Gandhi Bhawan, Chandigarh

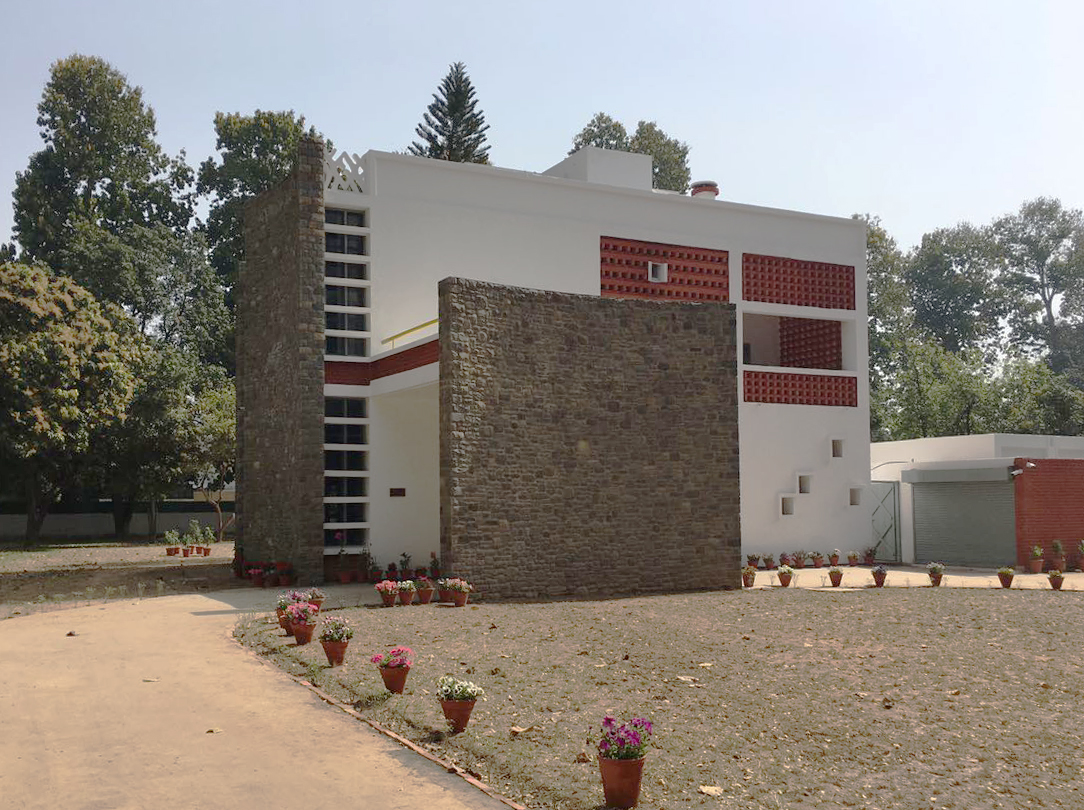
Pierre Jeanneret House/Museum in Chandigarh

Jeanneret, in collaboration with the English husband-wife team of Maxwell Fry and Jane Drew, was responsible for much of Chandigarh's large civic architecture project. His most remarkable contribution has undoubtedly been the designing of the fourteen categories of mass-housings that constitute the living and amenity areas of Chandigarh. Jeanneret, along with Ar. Jugal Kishore Chowdhary, Ar. Bhanu Pratap Mathur and Er. Agya Ram, was responsible for a significant amount of designing for the Panjab University, including the Gandhi Bhawan and the University Library.

Jeanneret stayed on in Chandigarh after its construction, advising the local government in his appointed capacity as Chief Architect of the city. In order to commemorate his legacy, the Chandigarh Administration has restored his residence, House No. 57, Sector 5 (Type 4J), and converted it into a Museum dedicated to his contributions to the city, on March 22, 2017, his 121st birth anniversary.

There were 8 linear meters of manuscripts, documents, photographs, drawings and letters between Jeanneret and Le Corbusier, which were collected over fifteen years during the Chandigarh project. They contain great detail of Jeanneret's responsibilities in the construction of the city. They were left to Jeanneret's niece, Jacqueline Jeanneret, upon his death in 1967. They are now preserved at the Canadian Centre for Architecture (CCA) in Montreal, Canada.

Equally significant was his role as a mentor to young Indian architects like Aditya Prakash, Jeet Malhotra, Jugal Kishore Chowdhary, Urmila Eugene Chowdhary, Shiv Dutt Sharma and many others.

Some of his major works in Chandigarh include the M.L.A. Hostels in Sector 3 and 4, Polytechnic for Men (now CCET) in Sector 26, the State Library, Town Hall and the Post & Telegraph Building in Sector 17, the Architects' Office (now Le Corbusier Centre) in Sector 19, the P.G.I.M.E.R. in Sector 12 (in collaboration with Jeet Malhotra, Aditya Prakash and H.S.Chopra), Government Model Senior Secondary School, Sector-16, St. John's High School, Sector 26 and the Shops on V4 in Sector 11.

== Furniture ==
In addition to buildings, Jeanneret also designed furniture, both independently and with Le Corbusier. He experimented with minimalist design, including a chair which required no fasteners. Along with Eulie Chowdhury, he also created the now-iconic Chandigarh chair.

== Death ==
Jeanneret, who was unmarried, died on 4 December 1967. In accordance with his will, Jeanneret's ashes were scattered in Chandigarh's Sukhna Lake.

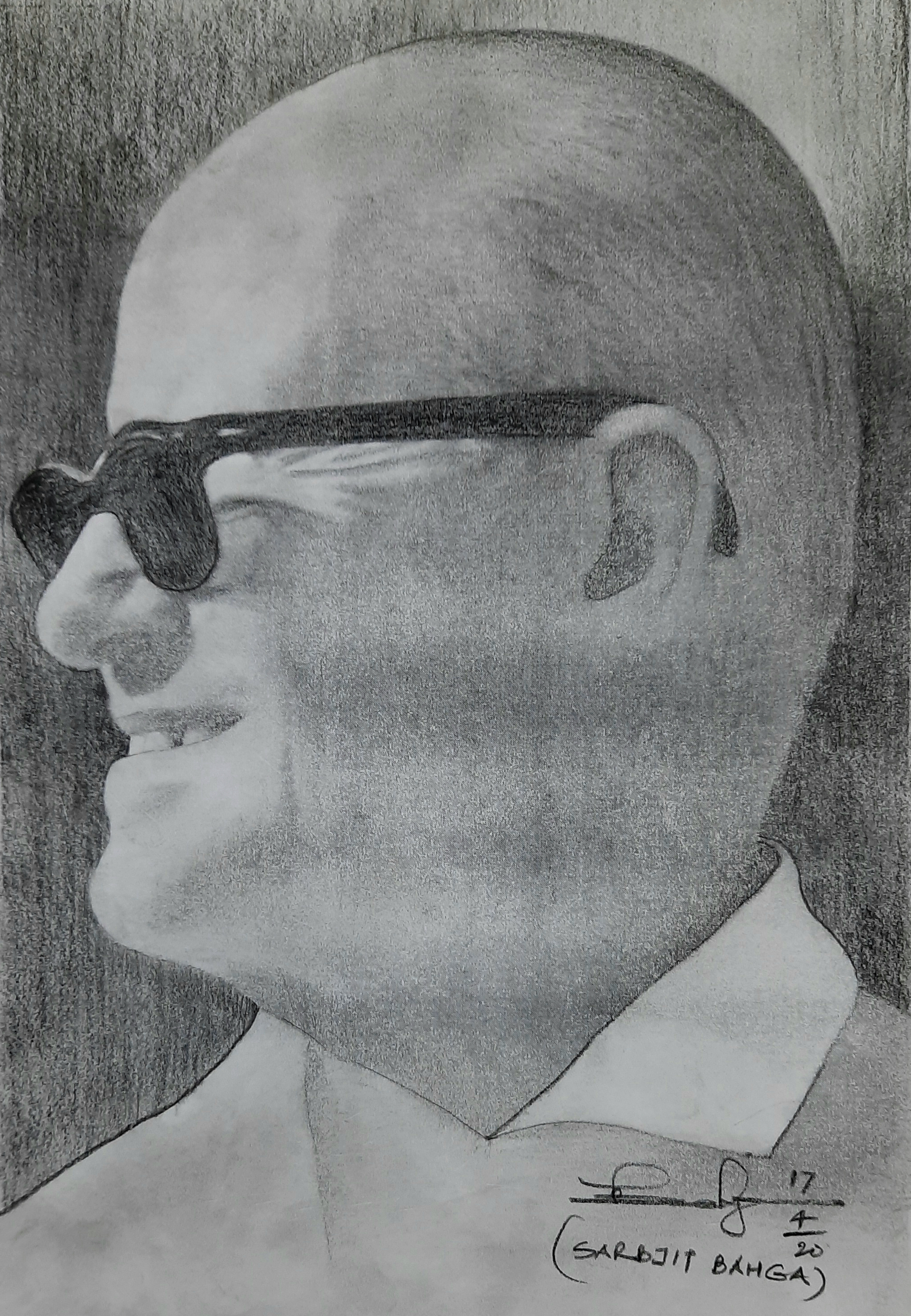
Pierre Jeanneret - A pencil sketch by Sarbjit Bahga

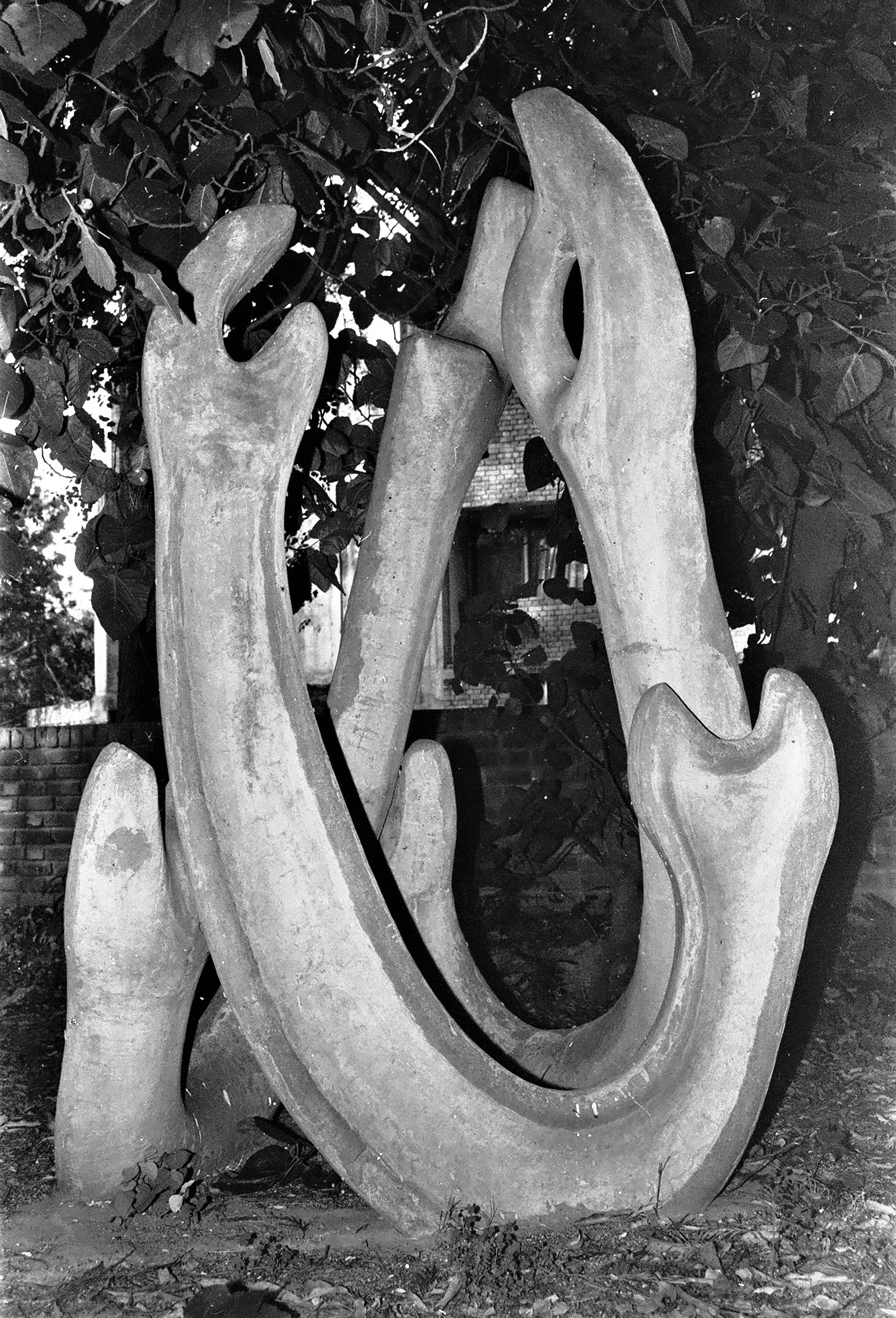
A sculpture by Pierre Jeanneret in Government School, Sector-16, Chandigarh.

== See also ==
- Chandigarh chair
- List of Indian architects
- Architecture of India
