= Sangeet Sharma =

Indian architect and writer

- Born: 1962 (age 63–64)
- Education: Government College of Architecture, Lucknow (University of Lucknow)
- Occupations: Architect, Writer
- Organization(s): SD Sharma & Associates; A3 Foundation
- Father: Shivdatt Sharma
- Awards: GRIHA Exemplary Performance Award (2018); Poet of the Year by The Poetry Society
- Website: Official website

Sangeet Sharma (born 1962) is an Indian architect and writer from Chandigarh, India. He has authored six books on architecture, including Architecture, Life, and Me (2008), The Corb's Capitol (2009) and Castles in the Air (2017).

Sharma is known for his contribution to architecture and literature. He has designed architectural work at the NIT Jalandhar, University of Jammu, Dr. Yashwant Singh Parmar University of Horticulture and Forestry National Institute of Pharmaceutical Education and Research and the PSG Institute of Technology and Applied Research, which was awarded the GRIHA Exemplary Performance Award by GRIHA Council.

== Career ==
=== Architecture ===
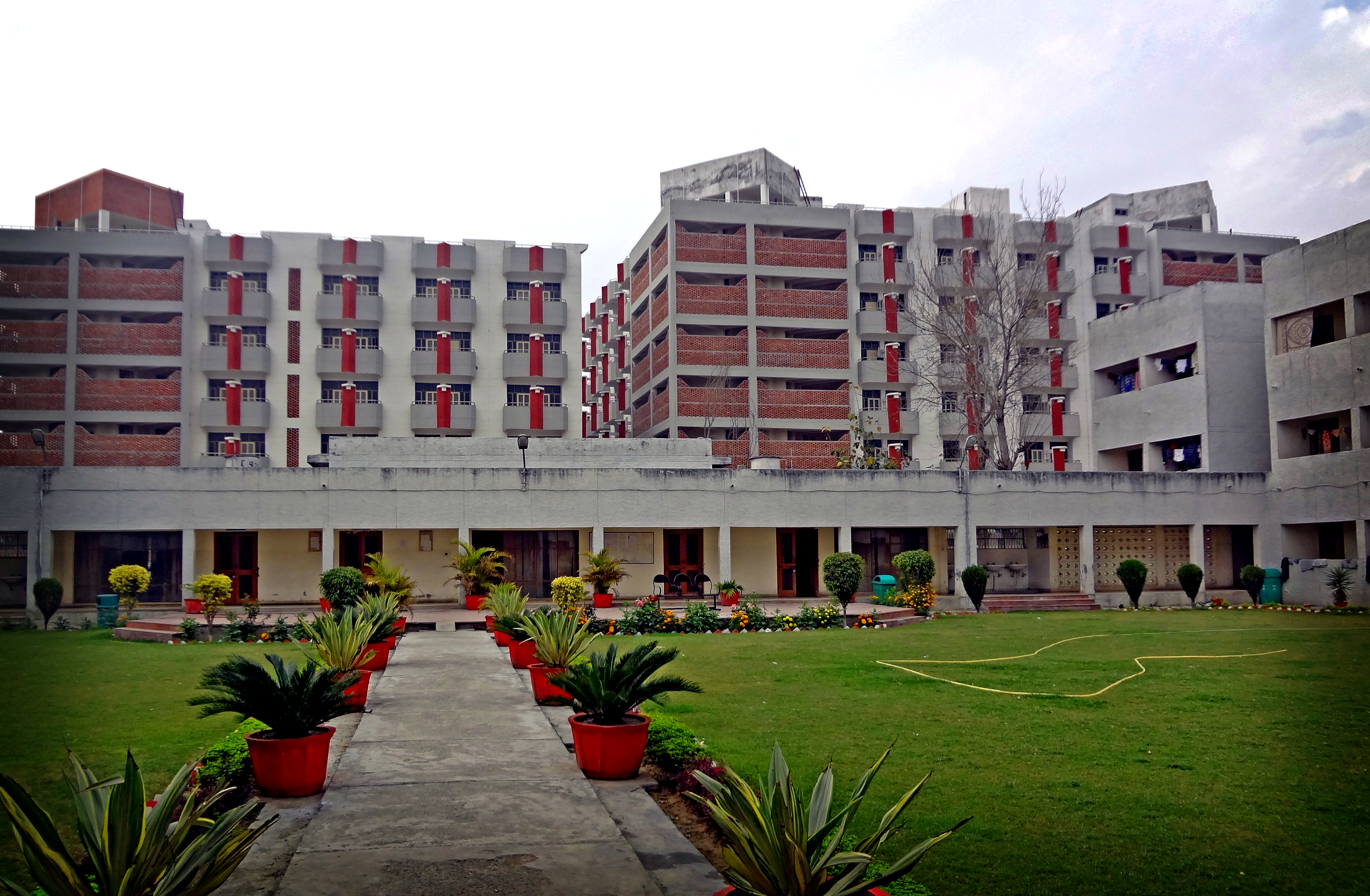
NIT-Jalandhar's Mega Boys Hostel was designed by Sangeet Sharma

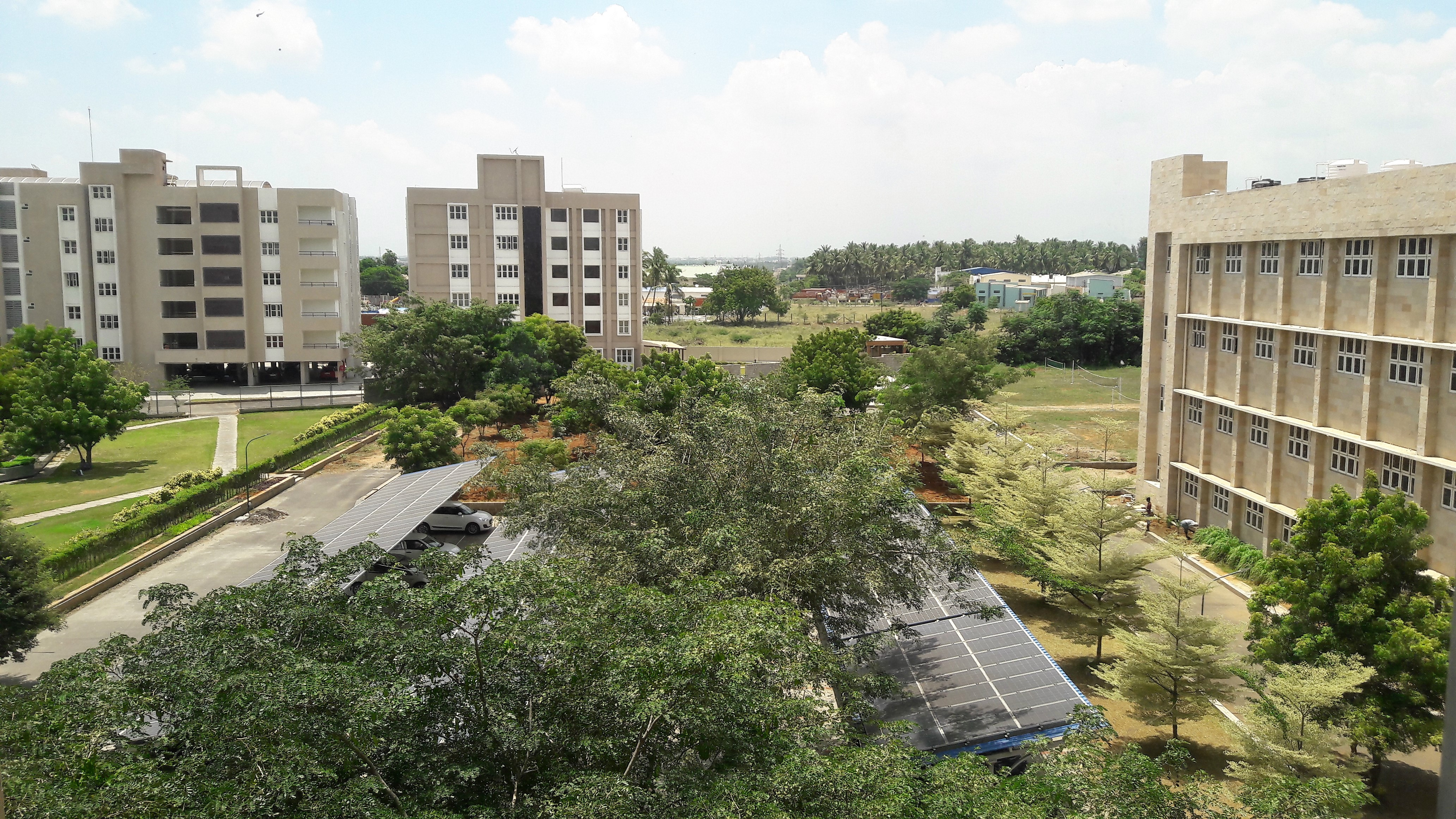
PSG Institute designed by Sharma

He is a practicing architect as a partner in SD Sharma & Associates, a firm founded by his father, Shiv Dutt Sharma. In September 2009, he was awarded the Outstanding Concrete Structure for 2009 by the Indian Concrete Institute for his project KMG IT Towers at Mohali, in Punjab. He was given a commendation award for excellence for his project Timex Factory at Baddi, in Himachal Pradesh, by the Indian Building Congress. Some of his notable projects include Damcosoft IT Park at Chandigarh, Mega Boys Hostel for NIT Jalandhar, PSG Institute of Technology and Applied Research at Coimbatore, Examination block & Wadia Museum of Natural History at the University of Jammu, Auditorium for Dr. Yashwant Singh Parmar University of Horticulture and Forestry at Solan, Cafe cum Library block at Punjab Police Housing Corporation, KMG IT Towers at Mohali, TIMEX Factory at Baddi and Boys Hostel for National Institute of Pharmaceutical Education and Research, Mohali. He is the founder-chairperson of the A3 Foundation, which promotes sustainable Architecture of India. His architecture is known as 'cubist modernism'.

=== Writing ===
Sharma's first book, Architectural Aesthetics, was published in 2005. In 2008, Rupa Publications published his second book, Architecture, Life, and Me: Reflections on Constructing Life, Brick by Brick, which recounts Sangeet's journey through architecture and life. Architecture, Life and Me was widely sold in India. His third book was The Corb's Capitol, published by Abhishek Publications in 2009. In 2010, he co-authored Step by Step Hospital Designing and Planning, published by JP Medical Publishers, followed by authoring Archi Talks: Architectural Opinions in 2015. His sixth book was Castles in the Air: Misadventures of a Profession, a fiction inspired by true events, was launched by Sharma in August 2017.

As a poet, Sangeet has penned a poetry collection titled The Touch of Moon. He was awarded the Poet of the Year by The Poetry Society (India).

== Books ==
- Architectural Aesthetics, 2005 ISBN 9788182470866
- Architecture, Life, and Me: Reflections on Constructing Life, Brick by Brick, 2008 ISBN 9788129113771
- The Corb's Capitol, 2009 ISBN 9781505885088
- Step by Step Hospital Designing and Planning, 2010 ISBN 9788184488203
- Archi Talks: Architectural Opinions, 2015 ISBN 9781507524695
- Castles in the Air: Misadventures of a Profession, 2017 ISBN 978-1945563850
- The Touch of Moon

== Reception ==
In January 2020, reviewing his book for the Construction Week, Dr. SS Bhatti, former principal of the Chandigarh College of Architecture, said, "Sangeet Sharma's Corb’s Capitol is an important milestone in architectural writing as a narration which says something serious, without being stodgy."

Reviewing Sharma's book, Castles in the Air, Soumyabrata Gupta of The Asian Age writes, "Written in a comical manner, Sangeet Sharma delves into the lives of architects as they, often unwittingly, or with oblique aspirations pursue a career to realize others’ dreams. The book, in a humorous manner deals with everything from trying to pursue a degree in architecture to the frustration of dealing with clients and their general distrust with architects."

== Personal life ==
He is the son of noted architect SD Sharma.

== Awards and recognition ==
- In 2018, he was awarded the GRIHA Exemplary Performance Award for his project PSG Institute of Technology and Applied Research by GRIHA Council, The Energy and Resources Institute (TERI).
- Sangeet Sharma was felicitated for excellence at the INT-EXT Expo & Awards by The Times of India and Indian Institute of Architects in February 2019.
- He received an honorary doctorate from Berkeley University.
- He was featured on the cover of Surfaces Reporter magazine's May 2021 edition.
- He was nominated for the Architect of the Year Award by Autodesk NDTV Design Awards.
- He received the 2015 Best Concrete Structure award for his project Mega Boya Hostel at NIT Jalandhar by Indian Concrete Institute.
- He was awarded the Best Concrete Structure 2013 for his project Netsmartz IT Building by Indian Concrete Institute.
- In 2013, he was noted as a future Architectural Icon by The Economic Times.

== See also ==
- List of Indian architects
- List of Indian writers
