= Chandigarh chair =

Chair designed by Pierre Jeanneret and Eulie Chowdhury

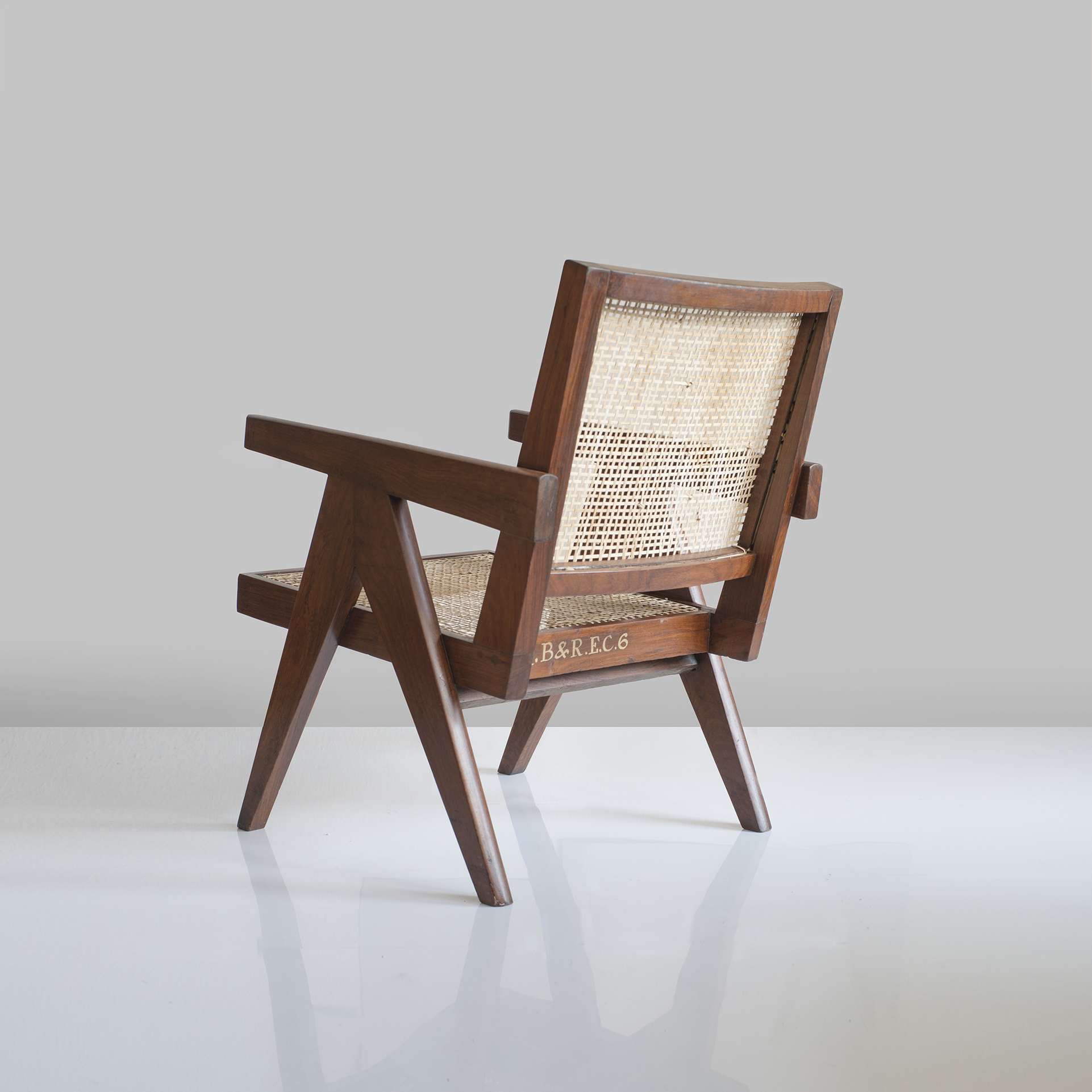
- Designer: Pierre Jeanneret, Eulie Chowdhury, et al.
- Date: 1950s
- Materials: Variations of wood / woven cane; wood / leather
- Style / tradition: Indian Modernism
- Height: 70.7 cm
- Width: 52.4 cm
- Depth: 72 cm

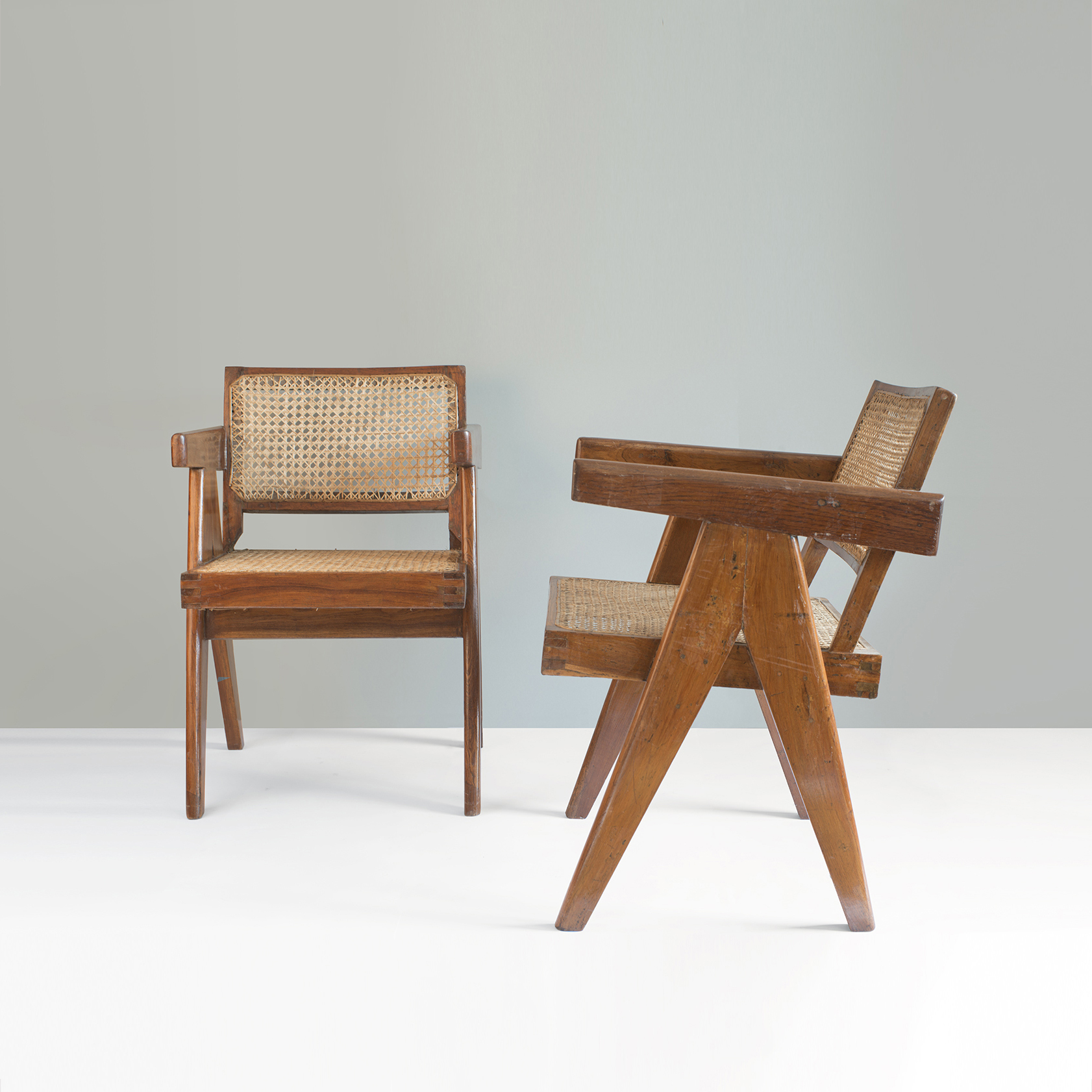
Chandigarh chair, side and front views

The Chandigarh chair was designed in the 1950s by Pierre Jeanneret, Eulie Chowdhury and other Indian designers for use in public buildings in the planned city of Chandigarh. The city was being developed as part of a major post-independence project and was designed by the architect Le Corbusier, who was invited by Indian prime minister Jawaharlal Nehru to create a city for the newly-independent India.

The Victoria and Albert Museum described the design as a "humble-looking wooden chair [that] has become a 20th-century design classic – much revered, reproduced and replicated."

== Authorship question ==
The chairs are sometimes referred to as 'Jeanneret chairs' by auction houses, which overlooks the role of Eulie Chowdhury (and possibly others) in their creation. There is no definitive evidence regarding the true designer of the chair as the workshop set up to design all the furniture worked in a collaborative way, and authorship was not documented.

A Chandigarh-based architect was quoted in The Tribune: "...the Indian architects were apparently not as keen on claiming authorship. As a result, their work continues to be overshadowed by the Western architects who worked here." In The Wall Street Journal, the Jeanneret expert Maristella Casciato stated that Chowdhury was "managing" the furniture production and that "she was extremely important in creating that network and supporting the production and all the detailing."

== Renewed interest in the late 1990s and subsequent looting ==
For most of their history in India, Chandigarh chairs merely served a functional purpose. Their design value has only been recognized since the late-1990s, when European dealers arrived in Chandigarh and started buying them in bulk after they were "thrown out" by the government and "sold for peanuts". These chairs were taken to the West, restored, exhibited, gained a cult following, and were sold at auctions for significant sums.

Recent scholarship on the chairs has pointed out several issues associated with their history: overlooking the role of Indian designers in the workshop to play up the "Jeanneret-Corbusier" connection, in order to fetch higher prices in the Western auction houses; their procurement at extremely low rates by European dealers who knew more than their Indian counterparts; and appropriation of the out-of-copyright design by global studios and erasing their historical context during the sale.

Following a 2011 Ministry of Home Affairs ban on further sales and export of Chandigarh furniture from India, subsequent disappearances and international auctions have involved documented theft and smuggling, with organized networks reportedly bribing officials and forging documentation. From 2015 onward, there is also a documented pattern of theft cases inside Chandigarh. Reports detail stolen chairs and tables from institutions such as the Government College of Art & Craft and Panjab University, consignments intercepted at airports, and internal inquiries against staff involved in unauthorised removals, all occurring after the MHA order came into force. There has been an emergence of a "furniture mafia" and "organised gangs" that bribe officials, forge documents, and even replace originals with replicas to smuggle furniture abroad, explicitly linking this activity to the continued appearance of Chandigarh pieces in international auctions despite the legal ban.

== Current production ==
There are no exclusive licenses for the production of Chandigarh chairs, as Jeanneret "never filed for patents or copyrights". As their popularity has grown in the 21st-century, multiple studios across the world have produced their own versions.

== See also ==
- Chandigarh
- List of chairs
