= List of Indian architects =

The following is a list of notable Indian architects.

== 19th century ==
- Gagan Chandra Biswas
- Henry Irwin
- Samuel Swinton Jacob
- Frederick William Stevens
- Charles Wyatt
- Edwin Lutyens
- Herbert Baker

== 20th and 21st centuries ==
- Gagan Chandra Biswas
- Sunita Kohli
- Laurie Baker
- I. M. Kadri
- Claude Batley
- Christopher Charles Benninger
- Eulie Chowdhury
- Charles Correa
- Hafeez Contractor
- B. V. Doshi
- Nari Gandhi
- Satish Gujral
- Krishnarao Jaisim
- Shimul Javeri Kadri
- Achyut Kanvinde
- Anupama Kundoo
- Anil Laul
- Pravina Mehta
- Rahul Mehrotra
- Piloo Mody
- Prem Nath
- Eugene Pandala
- Bimal Patel
- Sangeet Sharma
- Shashi Prabhu
- Sheila Sri Prakash
- Raj Rewal
- Kamal Sagar
- G.Shankar
- Joseph Allen Stein
- V. Ganapati Sthapati
- Chitra Vishwanath
- Brinda Somaya
- Arpan Shah
- Amit Khanna
- Bruno Souza
- Gerard da Cunha
- Joshua Ashish Dawson
- Bijoy Jain
- Abha Narain Lambah

== See also ==
- Architecture of India
- List of architects
