= Shimul Javeri Kadri =

Indian architect (born 1962)

- Born: October 18, 1962 (age 63); Mumbai, India
- Education: University of Michigan, Academy of Architecture, Mumbai
- Spouse: Rahul Kadri

Shimul Javeri Kadri is an Indian architect who is the founder of SJK Architects, an architectural firm in the city of Mumbai, India.

It has won multiple international & national awards including the Prix Versailles Award (2016) and the World Architecture Festival Award (2012). It has also been named one of Architectural Digest's Top 100 (AD 100) and Top 50 (AD50) that features the most influential architects and interior designers in India. Kadri has a philosophy of building in harmony with nature—using natural elements, sunlight, wind, natural materials, and cultural contexts.

Her projects include museums, hotels, office and industrial buildings, educational institutions, and bungalows.

== Biography ==
Kadri is the youngest of three children and was thirteen years old when she decided she wanted to be an architect. Kadri studied architecture in Mumbai at the Academy of Architecture where she graduated in 1985. Starting in 1986 she studied urban planning at the University of Michigan Ann Arbor. After graduate school, she began her career working for a company in California. She set up SJK Architects after she returned to India from the US in 1990.

Other significant projects include the Synergy Lifestyles factory in Karur, Sparkrill International School and SR Engineering College in Warangal and Ayushakti, an ayurvedic health resort in Mumbai. The challenge was to build this ayurvedic resort in a crowded Mumbai suburb within a narrow 16 m wide plot bounded on three sides by residential buildings, yet infuse it with light, air, space, joy and peace. Kadri's other works include leading the design for a hotel at Bodh Gaya, and an apartment building in Chennai.

Shimul serves as a trustee for Akshara, a women's resource centre in Mumbai a for Save the Children India where she has been actively steering education and women's projects.

== Honors and awards ==
Award-winning buildings she has designed include the Automobile Design Studio for Mahindra and Mahindra Limited, India, which won the Chicago Athenaeum Museum of Architecture and Design Award 2016. The design of the Dasavatara Hotel in Tirupati, India won the Prix Versailles Special Prize in 2016, while the design of the Lotus Cafe in the same hotel won the Prix Versailles in the Restaurants category. The design and architecture of the Nirvana Films office, Bengaluru, has won multiple awards including the World Architecture Festival Small Project of the Year Award 2012, the Excellence in Design Award, and the FuturArc Green Leadership Award.

In 2018 Architectural Digest named her firm as one of their AD100 awards.
