= Eulie Chowdhury =

Indian architect (1923–1995)

- Born: Urmila Eulie Chowdhury; 4 October 1923; Shahjehanpur, Uttar Pradesh, India
- Died: 20 September 1995 (aged 71); Chandigarh, India
- Occupations: Architect, landscape architect, designer, teacher, and writer

Urmila Eulie Chowdhury (4 October 1923 – 20 September 1995) was an Indian architect who worked during the mid-to-late 20th century. She worked in the fields of general architecture, landscape architecture and design, and was also a teacher and writer. She was a pioneer woman architect working in India. Some sources state that she was also the first female architect in Asia. After her education she worked in close collaboration with Le Corbusier in the planning design and construction of the city of Chandigarh.

Chowdhury, along with Pierre Jeanneret, is also credited for the creation of the now-iconic Chandigarh chair, for which the Victoria & Albert Museum wrote: "its fascinating origin story is often untold, and its designer, Eulie Chowdury, usually remains uncredited".

== Early life and family ==
Chowdhury was born in Shahjehanpur in Uttar Pradesh in 1923. She earned a Cambridge School Certificate from Kobe, Japan, studied architecture at the University of Sydney, and at the Conservatory of Music of the Julian Ashborn School of Art, Sydney, and earned a degree in Ceramics in Englewood, New Jersey. Her father was a diplomat, so she grew up traveling around the world. She was married to Jugal Kishore Chowdhary, who worked as a consulting architect with the Government of Punjab.

== Career ==
She is among a small group of women architects who were working in Asia during her career. While some sources credit her as the first woman architect in Asia, others like Aida-Cruz Del Rosario were working at similar dates, and women like Perin Jamsetjee Mistri and Dora Gad preceded her by a decade or more.

After working for a short time in United States, she returned to India in 1951 and became a member of a team headed by Le Corbusier for planning the design and construction of Chandigarh during 1951–63 and 1968–70. She was the only connection between Le Corbusier, Pierre Jeanneret, and the Indian architects and administrators. Her assignments included the Home Science College, the Women's Polytechnic and many residential complexes of the ministers. Her third assignment, from 1971 to 1976, was as the Chief Architect, who she worked for the second stage of Chandigarh city planning.

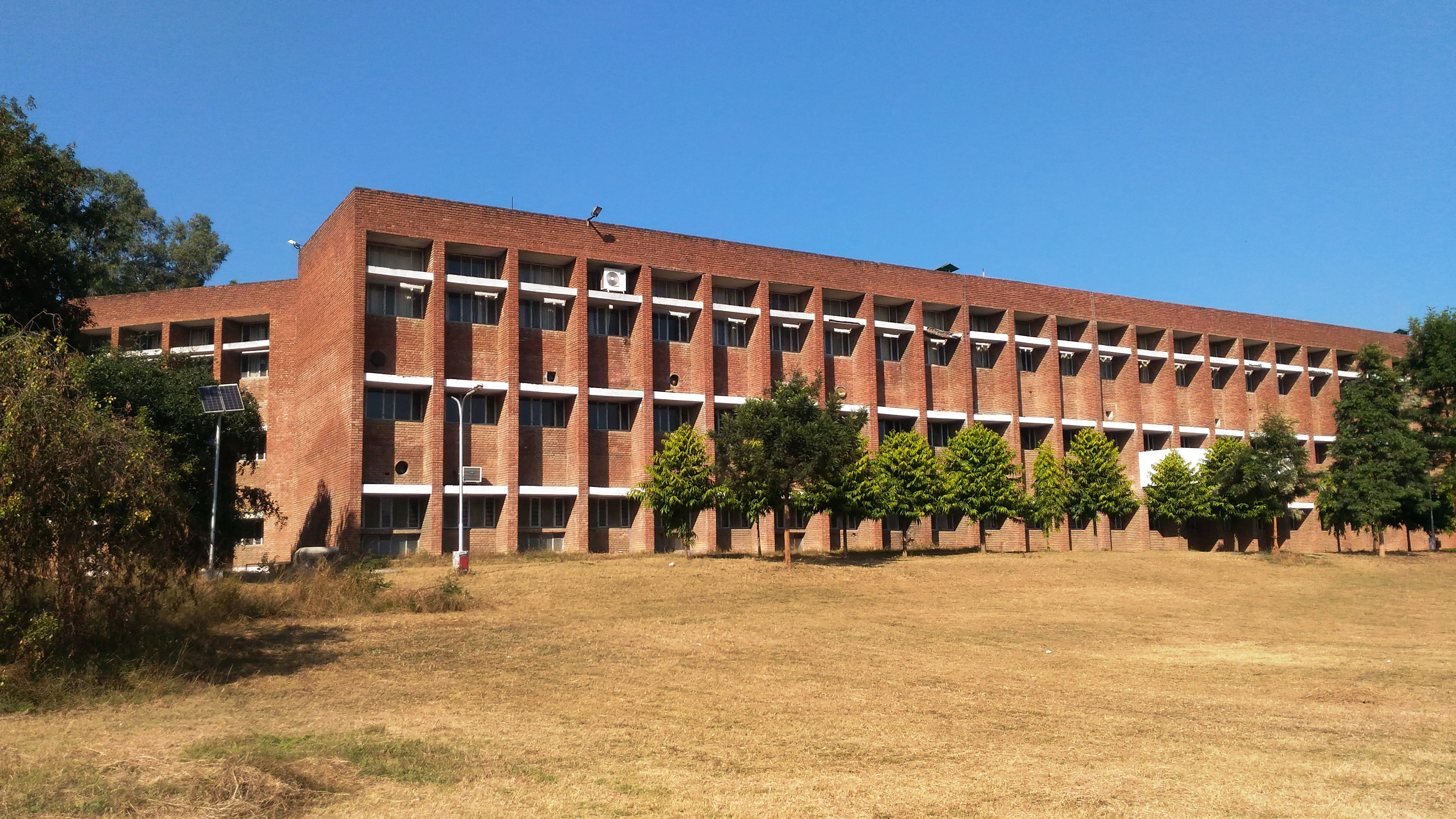
Government Home Science College, Sector 10, Chandigarh

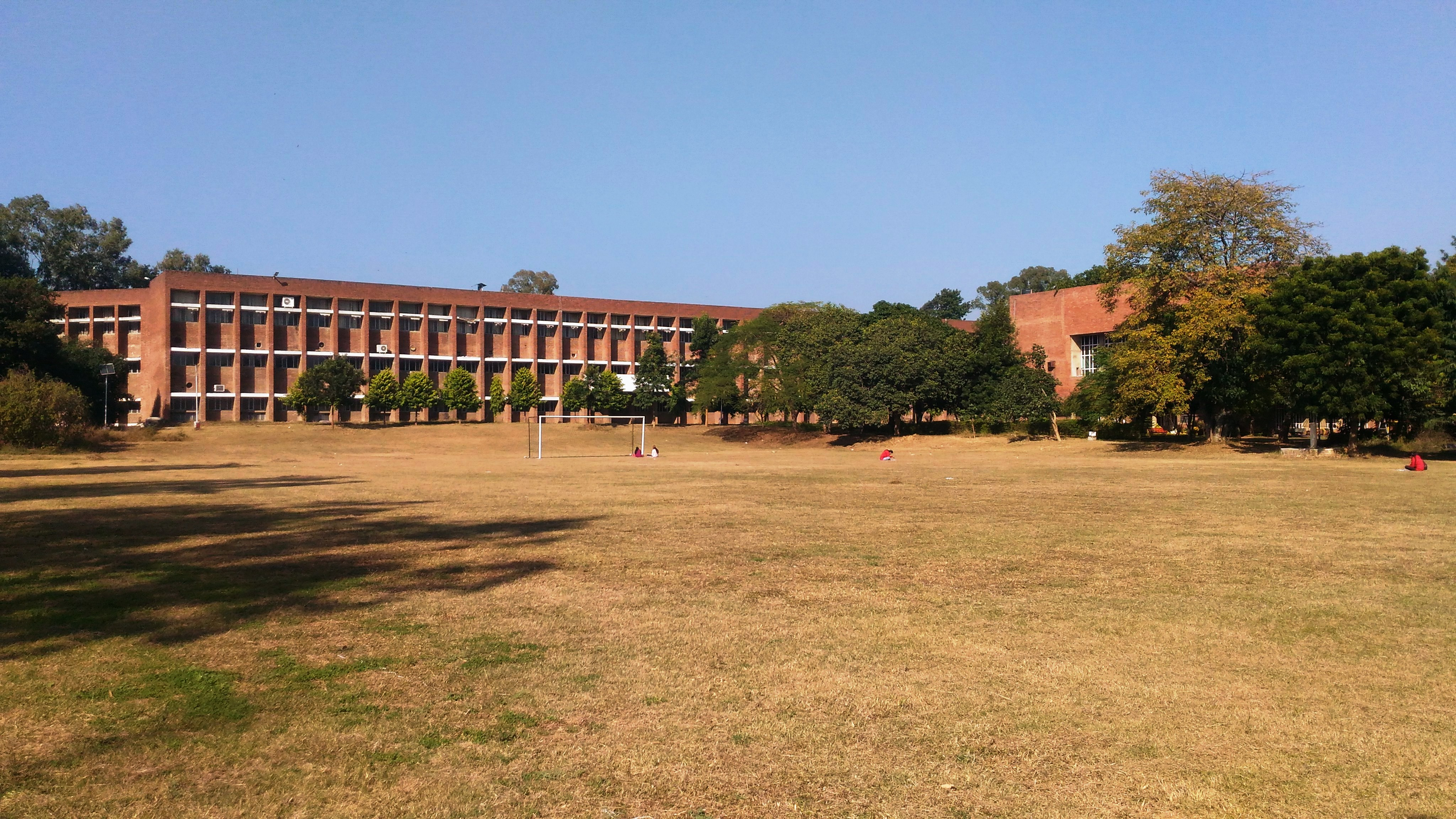
Government Home Science College, Sector 10, Chandigarh

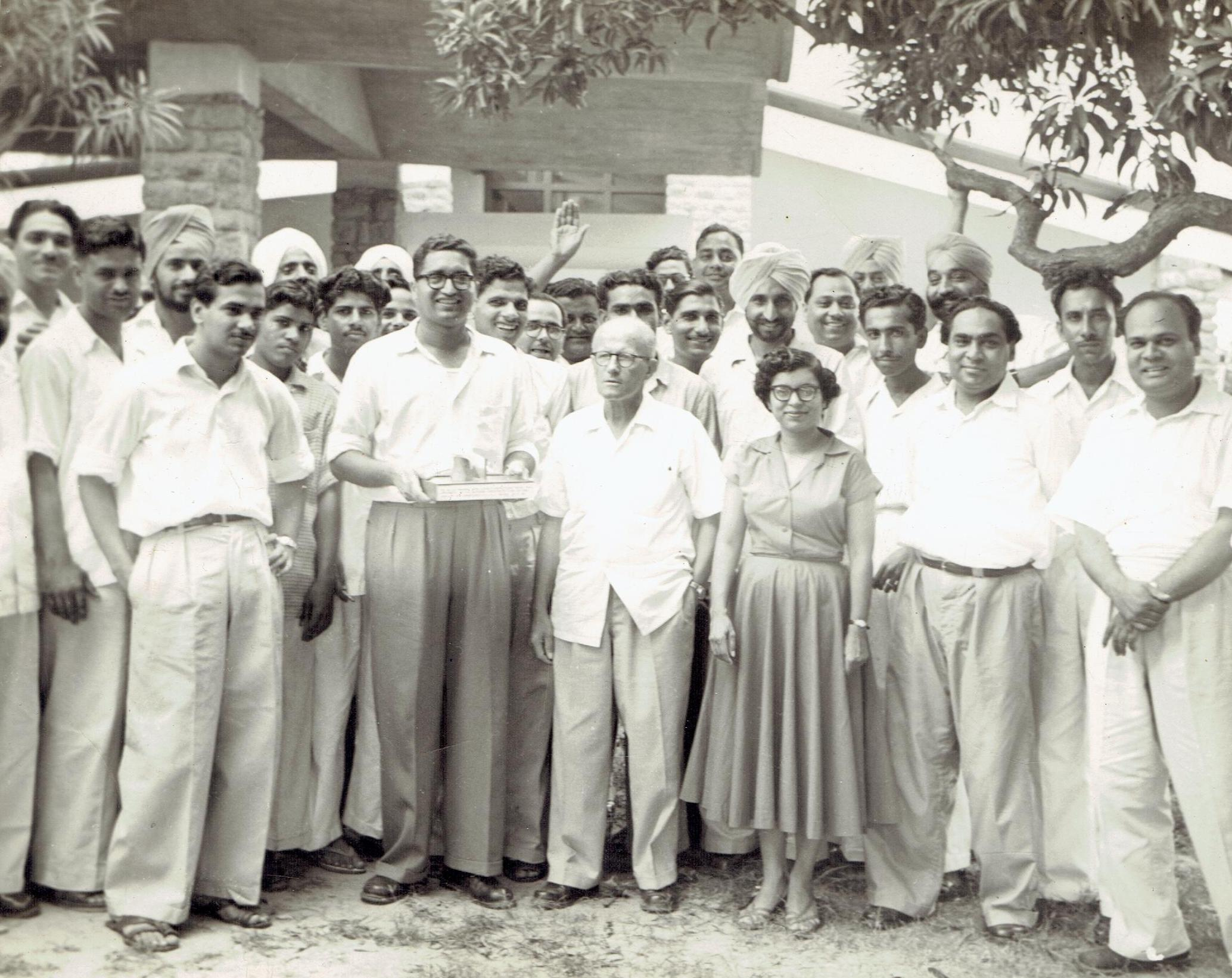
Urmila Eulie Chowdhury with Pierre Jeanneret and other colleagues of Chandigarh Capital Project. (1960 photo)

Chowdhury's assignment during the period 1963–65 was as the Director of the School of Architecture of Delhi. During this period she also authored a book of memories of Le Corbusier titled Those Were The Days.

In 1970, she was Chief State Architect of Haryana and from 1976 to 1981 the Chief State Architect of the State of Punjab.

Chowdhury's work, like that of the architects she worked with, was deeply impacted by the climate and the limited footprint. Chowdhury also designed furniture and adapted Jeanneret's furniture to a smaller scale. This was possibly inspired by her own petite stature.

== Later life ==
She retired from public service in 1981 and then worked on her own in private practice in Chandigarh. She was involved with many publications, which included the translation of Le Corbusier's book, Three Human Establishments, from French to English, which became an official publication of the Punjab government. She also wrote articles for magazines, including Progressive Architecture, Architectural Design and Casabella.

In 1983, she established the Alliance Française de Chandigarh. She wrote articles in the Saturday Plus supplement of The Tribune and wrote a column titled Sinners and Winners. She advocated for euthanasia.

== Death and legacy ==
She died on 20 September 1995 in Chandigarh, India. Chowdhury was a pioneer woman in Indian architecture.

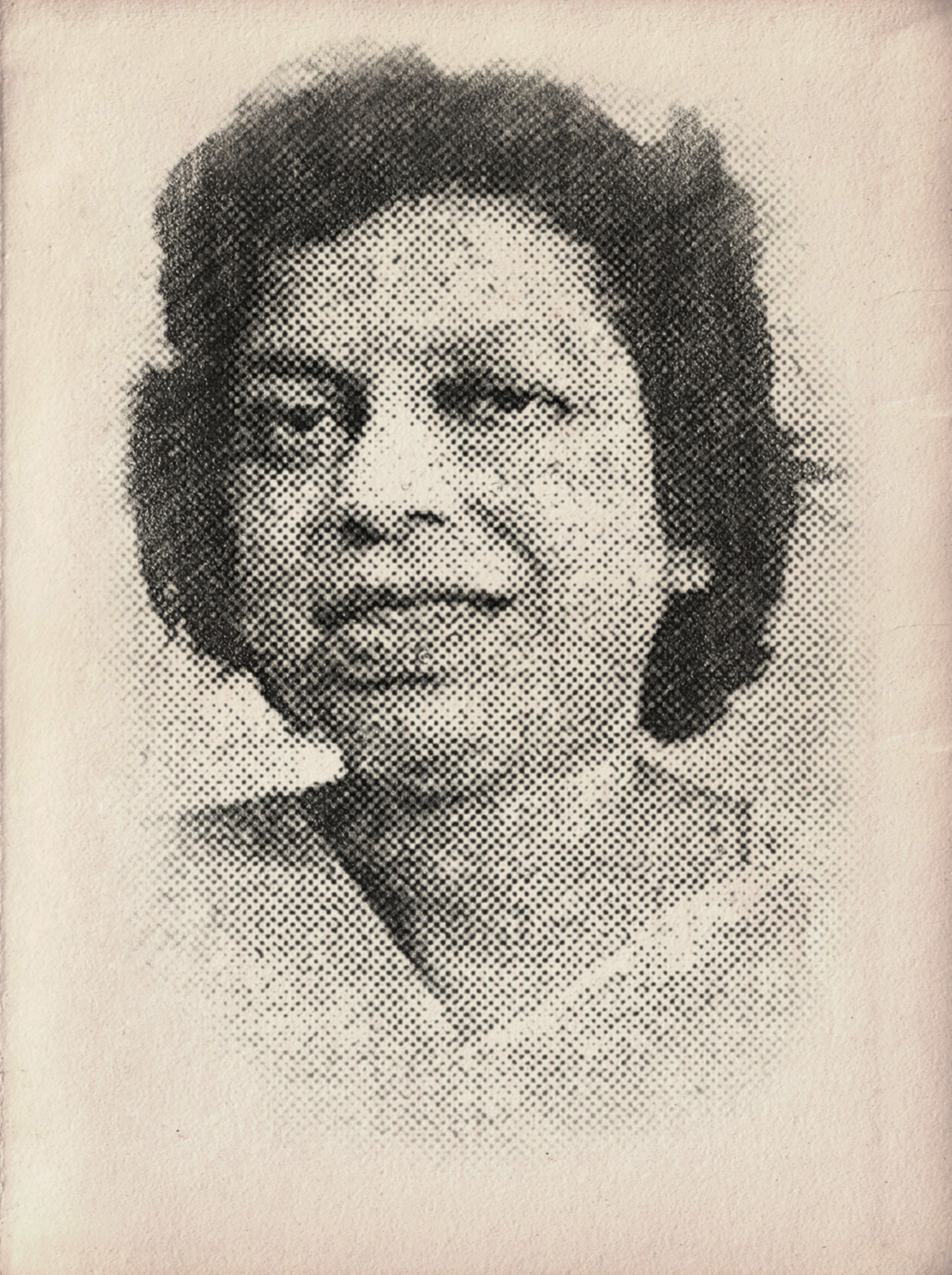
Eulie Chowdhury.

== Bibliography ==
- Corbusier, Le; Cohen, Jean-Louis (2007). Toward an Architecture. Los Angeles, California: Getty Publications. ISBN 978-0-89236-822-8.
- Saran, Gursaran Singh (2013). The Wheel Eternal. Pittsburgh, Pennsylvania: Dorrance Publishing. ISBN 978-1-4349-6900-2.
