= Gandhi Bhawan, Chandigarh =

Major landmark dedicated to Mahatma Gandhi in Chandigarh, India

Coordinates: 30°45′43″N 76°46′17″E

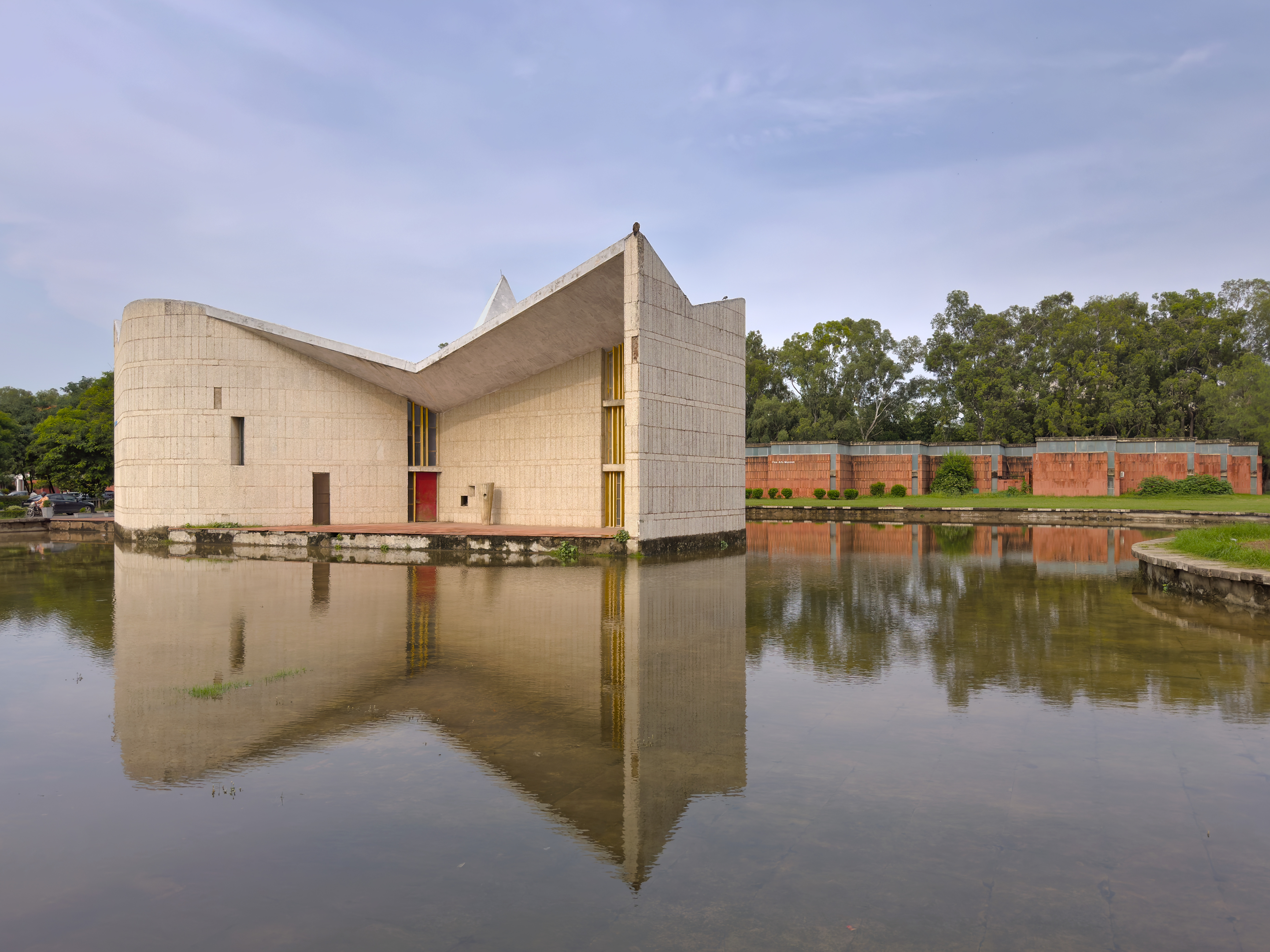
Gandhi Bhawan

The Gandhi Bhawan is a major landmark of the city of Chandigarh, India, and a center dedicated to the study of the words and works of Mohandas K. Gandhi. It was designed by architects B.P Mathur in collaboration with Pierre Jeanneret.

== Design ==
It is an auditorium hall that sits in the middle of a pond of water. A mural by the architect greets visitors at the entry. The words "Truth is God" are written at the entrance. Today, it also houses a substantial collection of books on Mohandas Gandhi. The Gandhi Bhawan's three-part, pinwheel plan, abstract sculptural qualities, and fluid use of planes reflect the modern vision of the International Style. The merging of sharp, brusque angles with lyrical curves recalls the linear tensions of the ancient Sanskrit alphabet. The pools surrounding the building evoke Mughal tombs, some of which were similarly laid out on terraces surrounded by water, as well as the ritual bathing pools of Hindu Temples. Yet the abstract style does not convey any specific religious connotations.
