= Sheila Sri Prakash =

Indian architect and urban designer (born 1955)

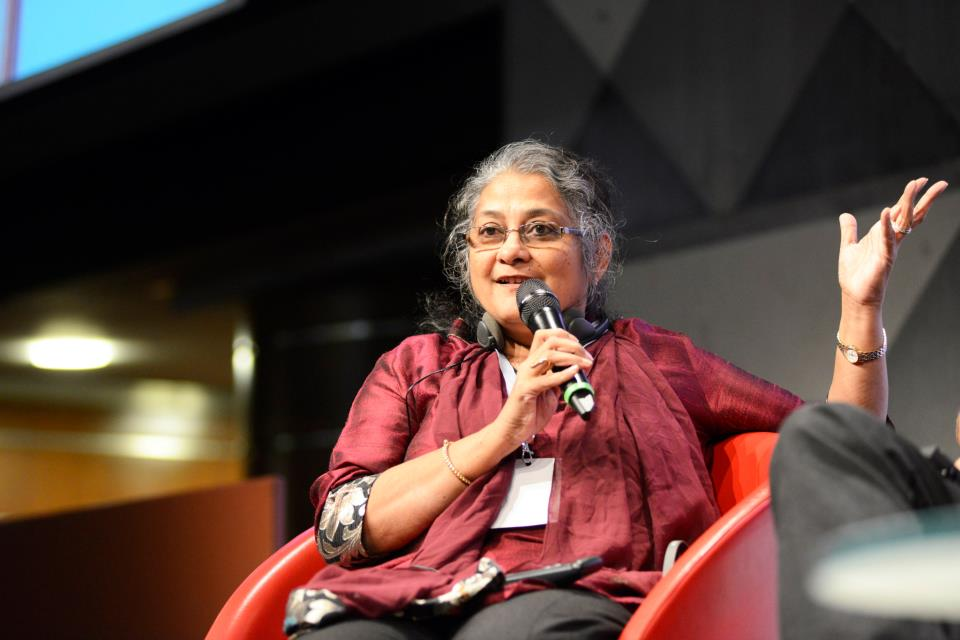
- Sheila Sri Prakash addressing the World Economic Forum in 2013
- Born: Sheila Sri Prakash; 6 July 1955 (age 74); Bhopal, India
- Education: Anna University School of Architecture and Planning
- Occupations: Architect; Urban designer Executive
- Board member of: Chennai Smart City Ltd; Shilpa Foundation; Nirmana Investments; Shilpa Architects
- Children: 2

Sheila Sri Prakash (born 6 July 1955) is an architect and urban designer of Indian origin. She is the founder of Shilpa Architects and is the first woman in India to have started and operated her own architectural practice.

== Biography ==
=== Early life ===
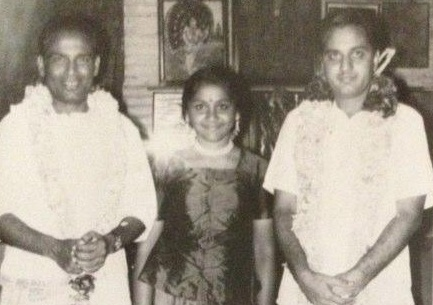
Kumari Sheila with Guru Dhandayudha Pani Pillai and Guru Chitti Babu (musician), 1968

Sheila Sri Prakash was born in Bhopal, India on 6 July 1955 to Lt. Col. G. K. S. Pathy, an officer in the Indian Army, and S. Thangamma.

=== Child prodigy artist and artistic career ===
As a child, she trained in classical Indian dance, music and the arts. She started learning Bharatanatyam when she was four years old and gave her first on-stage Arangetram performance in 1961, when Padma Bhushan Dhanvanthi Rama Rau called her a child prodigy. Sheila demonstrated a talent as a Bharatanatyam and Kuchipudi dancer, and also played the Veenai musical instrument. Over a period of nearly two decades as a performing artist, she gave performances as a dancer of Bharatanatyam and Kuchipudi. Her family moved to Chennai to give her greater opportunities in the classical arts and to be trained in Bharatanatyam by Sri Dandayudha Pani Pillai. She was a student of Vempati Chinna Satyam and was the protagonist in several of his dance dramas. She practised Bharatanatyam, Kuchipudi, Veenai, Classical Indian music, painting and sculpting.

As a Veenai artist, she played, composed and recorded Radha Madhavam and Sivaleela Vilasam with the Veenai musician Chitti Babu.

=== Education ===
She attended the Rosary Matriculation School in Chennai and attained a pre-university degree from Stella Maris College, Chennai. She enrolled in the Bachelors in Architecture from the Anna University School of Architecture and Planning in 1973, at a time when there was a strong bias against women entering the field, and attended the Harvard Graduate School of Design's Executive Education Program.

=== Architecture ===
1987: Year of Shelter for Shelterless. Award-winning low cost home designed upon invitation from the World Bank and HUDCO

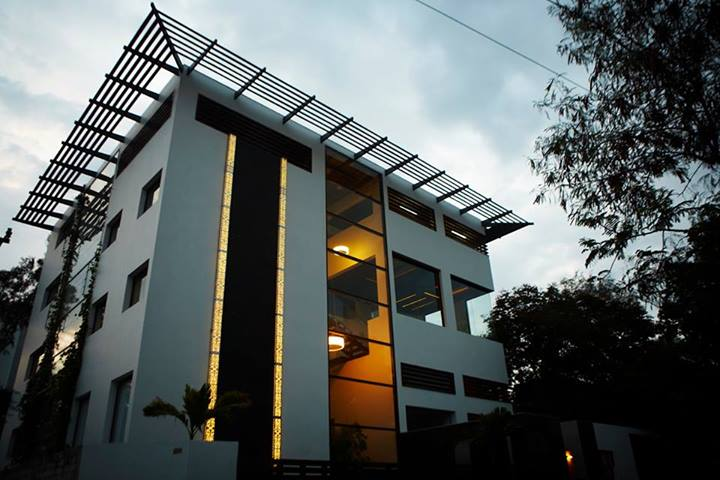
An IGBC LEED Platinum Rated Building designed by Sheila Sri Prakash and Pavitra Sri Prakash

She is considered as one of India's leading architects and is counted among the most influential female architects in the world today, having designed and completed over 1200 architectural projects, many of which are known for use of local arts, culture and heritage as inspiration for her designs. She is known for architectural theories surrounding Reciprocity in Design. Her work ranges from the low-cost Reciprocal House for the socio-economically underprivileged that she designed on invitation from the World Bank in 1987, to the first of its kind energy efficient commercial buildings, custom bungalows, residential communities, integrated townships, industrial facilities, art museums, sports stadiums, centers of education, public infrastructure and luxury hotels. Her research findings are particularly relevant in high-density rapidly developing economies

Her work in spaciology, particularly as it applies to healthcare and the leisure, wellness, and hospitality industry, examines the impact of the built environment upon human behaviour, through urban design, architecture and sociology.

She was a founding member in establishment of the Indian Green Building Council.

Several of her architectural designs can be seen at Mahindra World City, New Chennai, the Madras Art House at the Cholamandal Artists' Village, Kuchipudi Art Academy in Chennai, the Paranur railway station, and the World Bank funded urban housing development program in the year of shelter for the shelterless. She has combined the principles of Bharatanatyam, classical Indian music, sculpture and architecture in award-winning projects In 1993, she designed a home in Chennai with recycled materials and pioneered a system for rainwater harvesting. This system was made compulsory by the state of Tamil Nadu in 2003. It set a blueprint across India, as the most effective and low cost solution for addressing the crisis of depletion of freshwater sources in India.

She introduced vernacular and culturally relevant techniques in contemporary designs. She is known for using Indian art and culture as an integral parts to her designs, to achieve reciprocity and sustainability.

=== Preservation and Restoration Projects ===
==== Brihadisvara Temple ====
In 2012, Sheila Sri Prakash was selected to restore and preserve the Brihadisvara Temple, Thanjavur by the Archaeological Survey of India (ASI) which falls under the trusteeship of the Ministry of Culture of the Government of India. This was the first significant modern day attempt to restore this UNESCO World Heritage Monument, following a rigorous process of technical and design proposal evaluation. Sheila Sri Prakash's firm Shilpa Architects, was commissioned by the panel from the Archaeological Survey of India, out of more than a 100 short listed global and local architectural preservation considered for the project by the authorities.

This restoration effort involved research and study of the original archives, dating back to 950 CE, to unravel the techniques of ancient Indian engineering.

While structural upgrades are ongoing, the surrounding facilities have been enhanced through lighting, signage for devotees and visitors. The lighting of the monument is designed to enhance the natural color of the stone along with the sculptural forms adorning all corners of the temple.

=== World Economic Forum Global Agenda Council ===
In 2011, she became the first Indian architect to serve on the World Economic Forum's Global Agenda Council on Design Innovation, a 16-member team of international experts in design and innovation. She served on the World Economic Forum Global Agenda Council on the role of arts in society, in recognition of her signature works of architecture that feature art, culture and heritage.

As part of her role at the Forum, she developed the "Reciprocal Design Index" that details parameters and metrics surrounding sustainable design.

=== Reciprocity Wave & Festival ===
She is the founder of the Reciprocity Wave Movement, which is an art and design competition to raise awareness about holistic sustainability. The second Reciprocity Wave Event in Chennai was conducted in partnership with the Indian Premier League's Chennai Super Kings

Shilpa architects have already conducted three such initiatives, two in Chennai and one in Bangalore.

=== Involvement with Zonta ===
She is known for her contributions as an active member of Zonta International, which is an organisation that aims to enhance the status of women around the world. She served as the area director of Zonta International for her district and participated in events internationally.

=== Academia ===
Sheila Sri Prakash routinely participates as a juror or expert critique at student charrettes at Universities around the world.

She was a visiting scholar at Ball State University in 2002.

She currently serves on the visiting faculty of Leibniz University Hannover in Germany.

She was also invited to serve on the Board of Studies at the Anna University School of Architecture and Planning, for a three-year term. The Board of Studies influences the syllabus, key appointments of faculty/academic leadership and major initiatives at the Institution.

=== Recent projects ===
Shilpa Architects, Planners and Designers have been working recently on several projects, including a LEED Platinum rated office building as their own design headquarters. Other projects include the HITEX exhibition center in Hyderabad and the South City Township by Larsen & Toubro that is an approximately 4000 apartment residential township. Another large scale housing project is within Mahindra World City, the upcoming Taj 5-star beach resort near Pondicherry, the state of Tamil Nadu's first platinum rated office complex for Cethar Vessels, an office building for HDFC Bank, as well as the regional headquarters for the State Bank of India. Her portfolio of current projects includes Industrial architecture. She designed a large scale manufacturing facility and warehouse for de:OBO Bettermann in India and is currently designing a factory for the industry leading technology hardware manufacturer Flextronics.

=== Honors and awards ===
- Featured among the top "9 Female Architects Designing the Future" by Travel+Leisure magazine of Time Inc.
- Sustainability Champion of the Year for 2019
- Lifetime Achievement Award from Builders, Architects and Building Materials (BAM) in collaboration with Confederation of Indian Industry
- Bene Merenti Award from the university of Ion Mincu in 2017
- Honourable Architect Award from the Indian Institute of Architects (October 2015)
- Top 100 most influential architects in the world by it:Il Giornale dell'Architettura
- 50 most influential names in Architecture and Design in 2015 by Architectural Digest and listed among a category of "Reinventors" for having "built a formidable legacy" and an "inspirational practice that designs societies and not merely buildings or cities".

== See also ==
- List of Indian architects
- List of architecture firms
- List of architects
- Women in architecture
