= Mahindra World City, Chennai =

Mahindra World City, New Chennai MWC
- Suburb
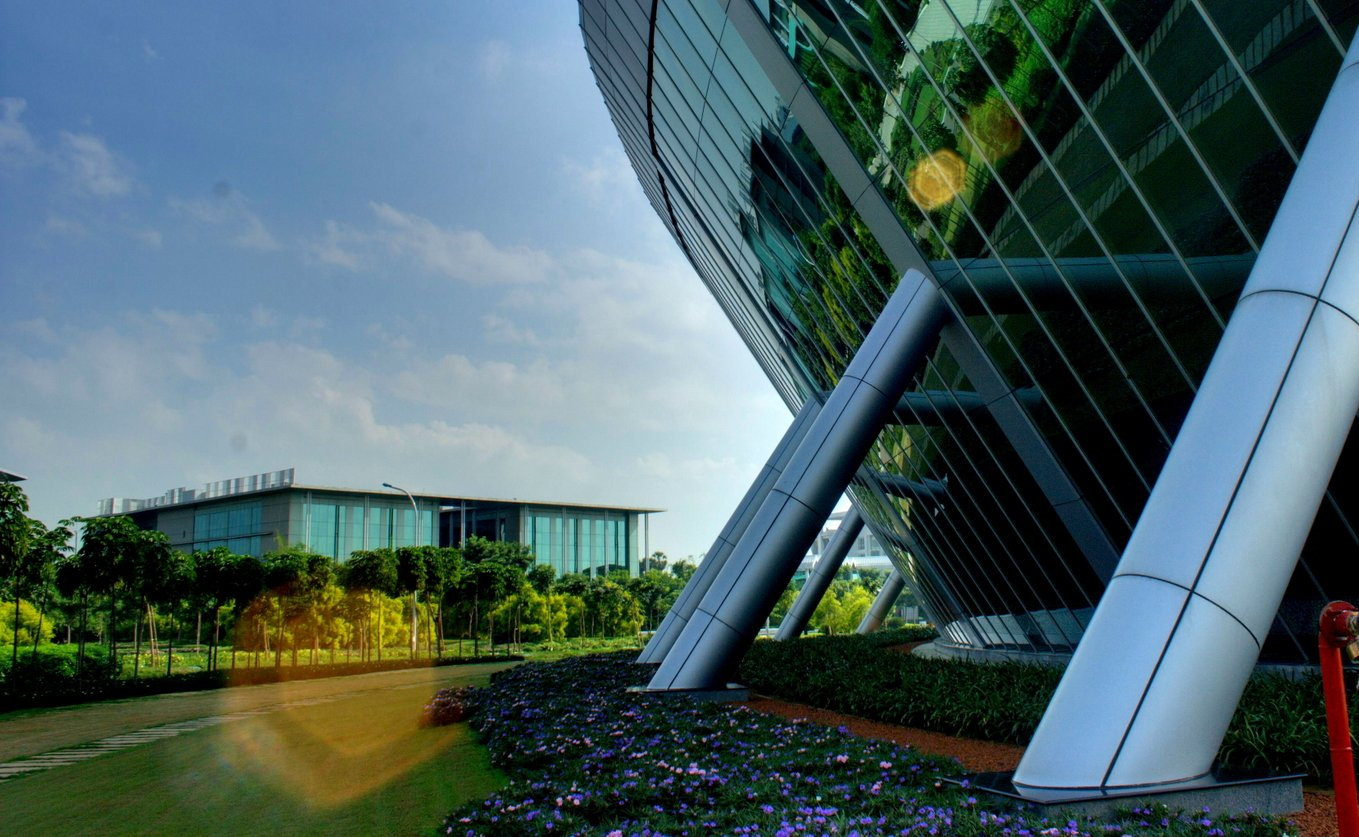
- Infosys building at Mahindra World City

- Location in Chengalpattu district, Tamil Nadu, India
- Coordinates: 12.73°N 80.01°E
- Country: India
- State: Tamil Nadu
- District: Chengalpattu
- Metropolitan area: Greater Chennai

Area
  - Total: 6.1 km^{2} (2.4 sq mi)

Languages
  - Official: Tamil
- Time zone: UTC+5:30 (IST)
- PIN: Chengalpattu-603002
- Telephone code: 91-44
- Vehicle registration: TN-19

Mahindra World City, New Chennai, Chengalpattu district, Tamil Nadu, is India's first integrated business city. It is a public–private partnership promoted by the Mahindra Group and TIDCO. It is situated near Maraimalai Nagar a southern suburb of Chennai. The city is a part of the Chennai Metropolitan Area and also a part of the area covered by the Chennai Metropolitan Development Authority (CMDA).

== Etymology ==
Mahindra World City is located outside Chennai city and was inaugurated on 21 September 2002 by the then Chief Minister of Tamil Nadu J. Jayalalithaa. Built on the model of sustainable urbanisation Mahindra World City grew from a bed of business, infrastructure and sustainable practices before evolving into a completely integrated city within a decade of its inauguration.

== Geography ==
Situated on the NH 45, Mahindra World City is located 50 km from Chennai city. It is one of the largest integrated business cities on the Golden Quadrilateral spread over 1,500 acres (6.1 km2). It is surrounded by rolling hills and a reserve forest. Several engineering colleges, educational and technical institutions are located along this corridor around MWC, Chennai.

== Economy ==
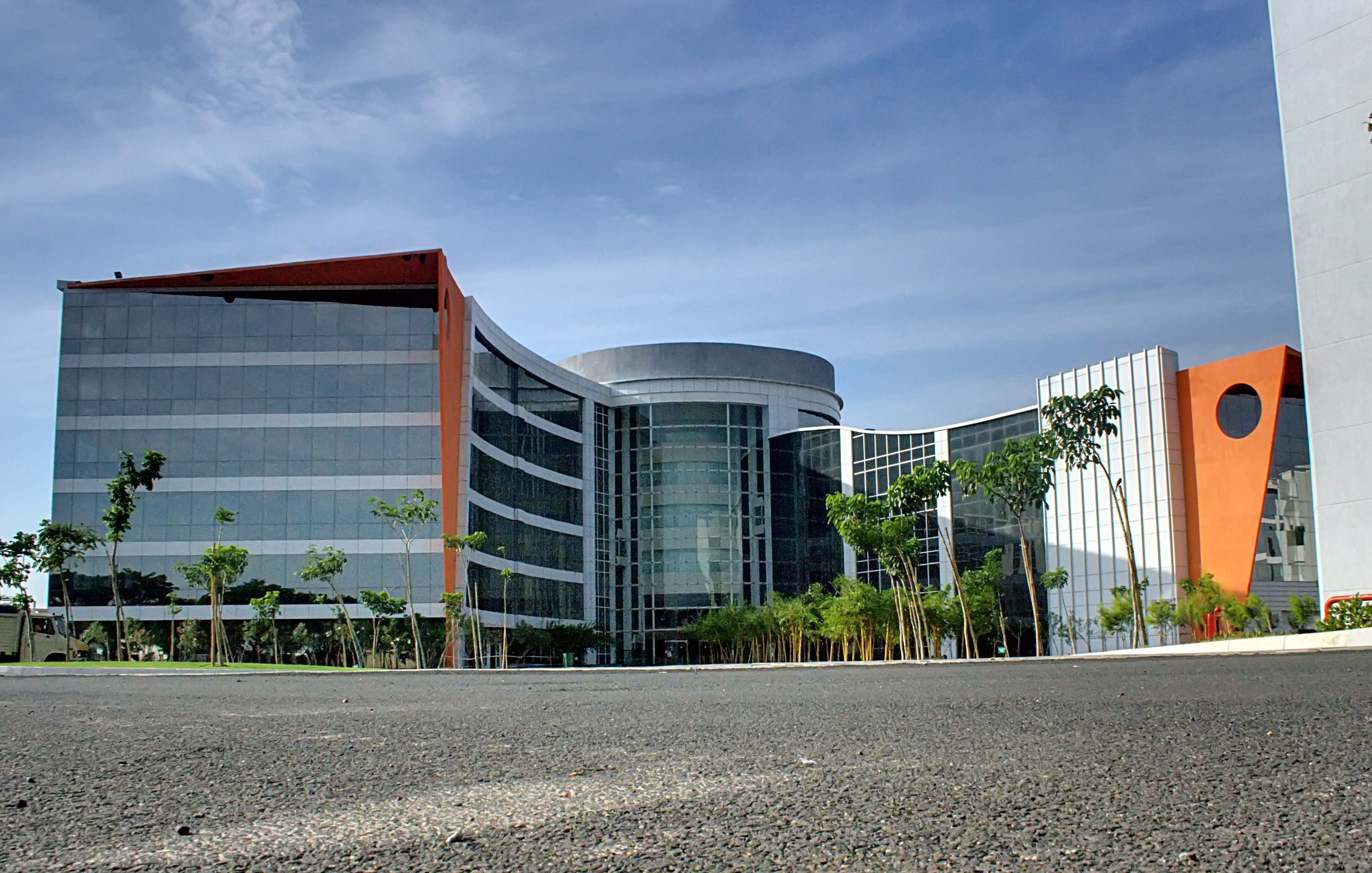
Infosys at Mahindra World City

The core purpose of the city was building a source of livelihood from which social infrastructure and then residential would evolve. It has drawn businesses from different parts of the globe to set up facilities in India.

Mahindra World City is currently a well-developed business district with companies such as Infosys, BMW, Braun, TTK Group, Capgemini, Renault-Nissan, Tech Mahindra, Wabco, NTN, Husky, Lincoln Electric, Wipro, Timken, cyber vole, TVS Group, and Parker among others.

Being one of the largest IT parks in the area along with a host of other industries, more than 25,000 employees have found employment in this zone.

BMW's latest vehicle the 3 Series Gran Turismo was rolled out of their plant in MWC Chennai.

== Civic administration ==
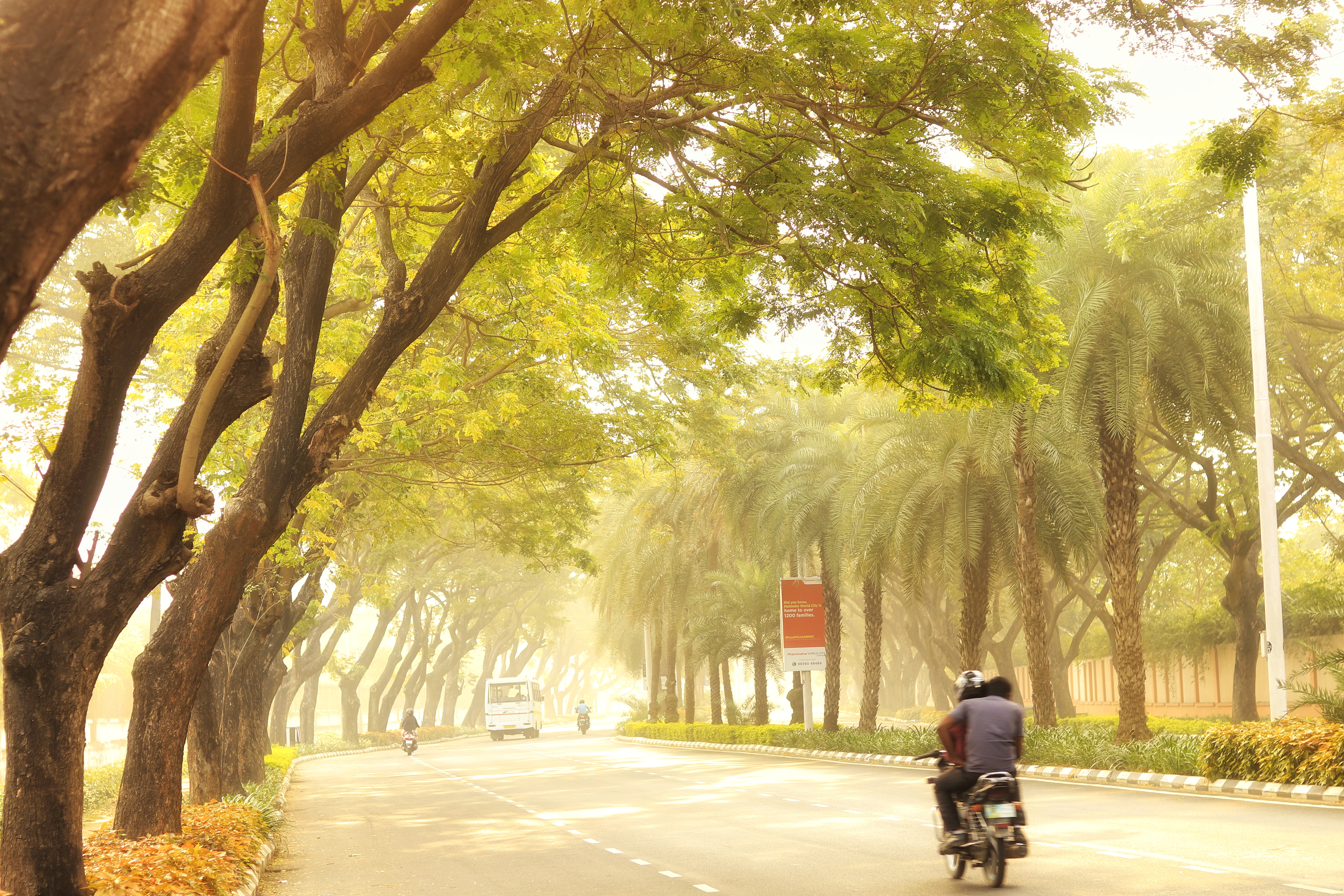
Chennai Mahindra world City IT park campus

The layout of the city is broken up in to Zones by the utility of the land. There are 3 sector-specific Special Economic Zones (SEZs) - IT (Services and Manufacturing), Auto Ancillaries and Apparel and Fashion Accessories, a Domestic Tariff Area and a Residential / Social zone. Spread across 285 acres, the Residential zone has been planned to provide living spaces supported by modern social infrastructure to over 6,000 families across diverse segments.

The MWC administration operates as the municipal corporation for the city with responsibility for the provision, upkeep and maintenance of the infrastructure and other facilities.

== Transport ==
Mahindra World City is well connected by both road and rail links, with Paranur railway station on site. It is 35 km away from Chennai International Airport and 55 km from Chennai Seaport.

Paranur railway station is a public private partnership initiative between Mahindra World City and Southern Railways. It is the first railway station to be redesigned and maintained by the corporate sector. It was designed by Architect Sheila Sri Prakash and firm Shilpa Architects.

== Mahindra World School ==
Mahindra World School opened in June 2008. The coeducational school based on the CBSE syllabus is currently functional from classes kindergarten to standard Xll, with 843 students and 65 teachers. The school will cater both to the schooling needs of the children of Mahindra World City employees/residents as well as of those residing in surrounding areas. Designed by the architect, Hafeez, the school is spread over a 5-acre (20,000 m2) campus nestled amidst sylvan surroundings. The school has received the National School Sanitation Award in 2012.

== Mahindra Research Valley ==
Mahindra Research Valley, the key research wing of the Mahindra Group is housed on 125 acres at the Mahindra World City, Chennai, MRV has been designed by Padma Vibhushan, Shri Charles Correa. It is home to over 2500 engineers and designers working in one of the most modern automobile and tractor R&D facilities in India.

== Mahindra World City Going II in Chennai ==
The Mahindra Group has plans to replicate this model of an integrated business city with industrial, residential and social infrastructure at ponneri in north part of Chennai. The ponneri facility will cover 1,000 acres (4.0 km^{2}) abutting NH5 will mainly focus on Domestic Tariff Area (DTA). It will also have a logistics park and a residential park.

== Mahindra Lifespaces ==
The Mahindra Group only allows Mahindra housing and Real Estate organizations to carry out construction activities in Mahindra World City.

== See also ==
- Economy of Chennai
- Mahindra World City
- Mahindra World City, Ahmedabad
