= Prem Nath (architect) =

Indian architect

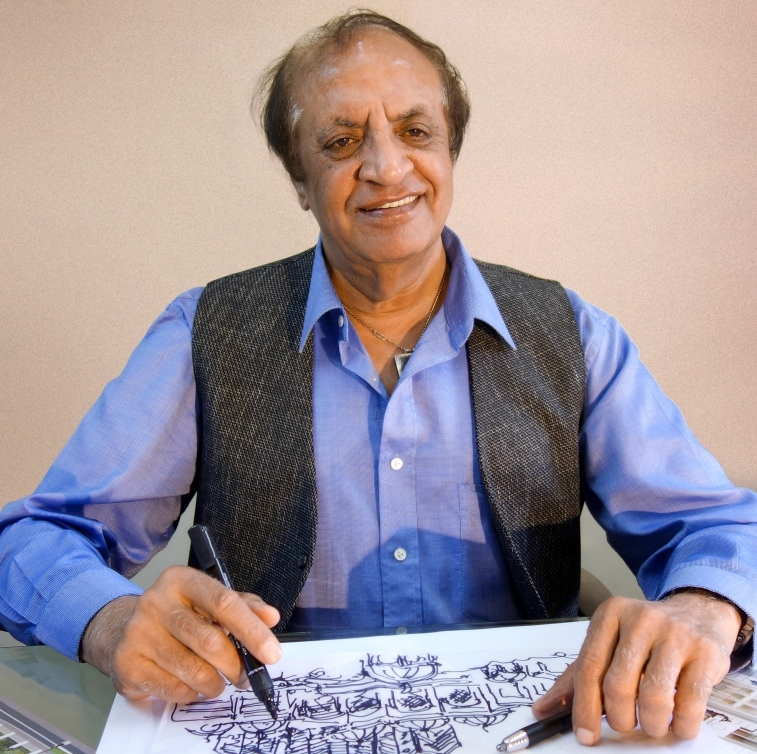
- Born: 1941 (age 84–85)
- Education: Sir J.J. College of Architecture
- Occupation: Architect
- Practice: Prem Nath and Associates
- Buildings: Revolving restaurant at Ambassador Hotel-Mumbai, Celebrity Homes, Cygnus world school-Gujarat, Golden Palm, Bangalore

Prem Nath (June 6, 1941) is an Indian architect with a wide spectrum of work.

== Early life ==
Prem Nath (June 6, 1941), Ar. Prem Nath is an Iconic Indian architect with a wide spectrum of work, also The Most Admired Architect in India. Awarded IIA Baburao Mhatre Gold Medal 2019, He completed his schooling in Delhi, and started working with an engineering firm where he used to take blueprints for draughtsmen. There he developed his interest in the field of architecture and enrolled himself in a graduate diploma program at Sir J.J. College of Architecture, Mumbai. After completing his diploma with highest honors from Sir J. J. College of Architecture in 1965, he started his career as an interior designer and used to work hard for 18–20 hours a day.

== Career ==
He was invited by J.A. Stein to work with him but he preferred to stay in Mumbai and opened his own firm Prem Nath & Associates in 1967. He is a member of the American Society Of interior designers and a fellow of the institution of Engineers (India) Charted Engineers. He has won the Architect of the year award in 1996 from Accommodation Times, the International Award if Architectural practices in 2005 from Actualidad, Spain. He is known for taking some leading initiatives such as India's first Revolving Restaurant – Ambassador Hotel, Mumbai. India's first Platinum Rated School campus – Cygnus World School in Vadodara, Gujarat, India's first Multiplex-Mall – Fame Adlabs at Citimall, Andheri, Mumbai designed for Ajmera Group, in early 2000s, India's first green rated township, HMEL Punjab.

== Memberships and Certifications ==
- Fellow of Indian Institute of Architects (IIA)
- Ex-president of the Indian Institute of Interior Designers (IIID)
- ASID (American Society Of Interior Designers) certification
- Member, U.S. Green Building Council (USGBC)
- Member, Indian Green Building Council (IGBC)

== Projects ==
Some of the Notable Projects are listed below:

- Golden Palm Resort, Bangalore
- HMEL Township, Bhatinda
- Cygnus World School, Gujarat
- Celebrity Homes
- Bhakti Park, Residential Complex, Mumbai

== Awards ==
- “India’s Most Admired Architects - 2021: by Golden Aims
- "India's Top Architect Award 2020" - by Construction World Architect & Builder Awards
- “IIA Gold Medal 2019” – India's Top Architectural award
- "Life Time Achievement Award 2020" by Reality+ INEX Awards, Mumbai
- Awarded with " Archid-Lifetime Achievement Award 2019" by Archid, Mumbai.
- Bestowed with "DNA Sir J.J. Architecture Award'18" by Sir J.J. College of Architecture.
- Design Legend Award by Society Interiors 2015
- HUDCO Design Award 2015 for Green Architecture;

== Gallery ==
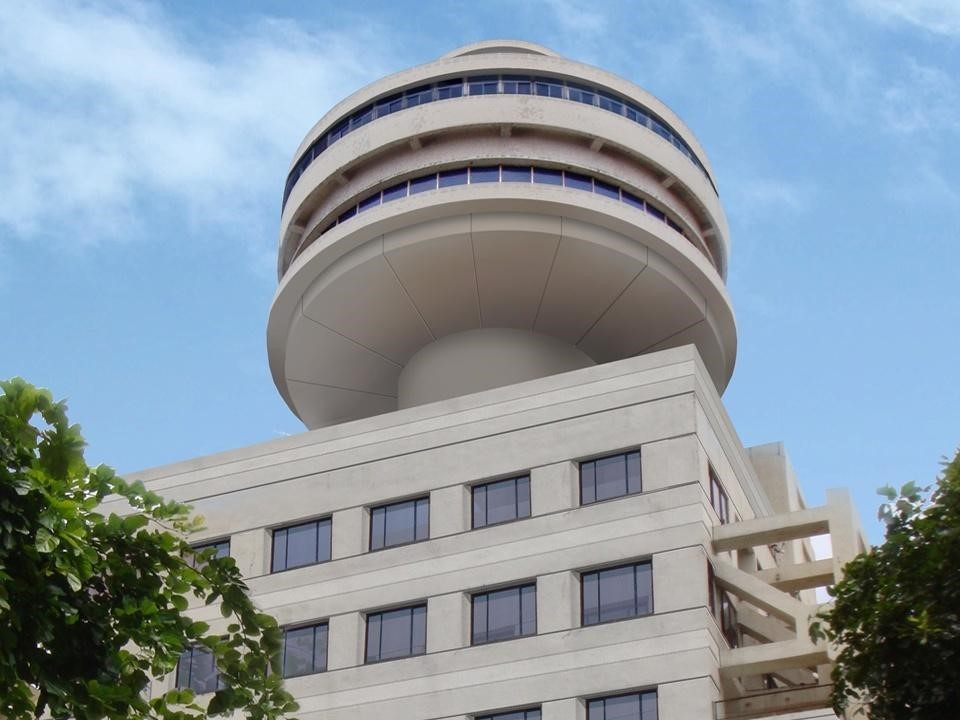
First revolving restaurant at Ambassador Hotel, Mumbai

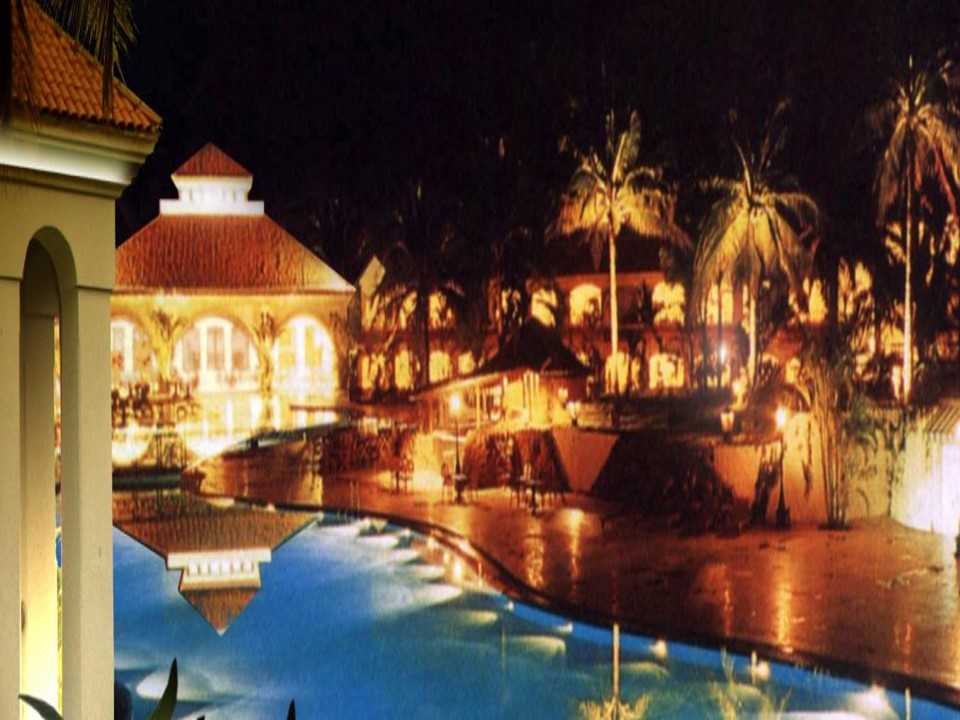
Golden Palm Resorts, Bangalore

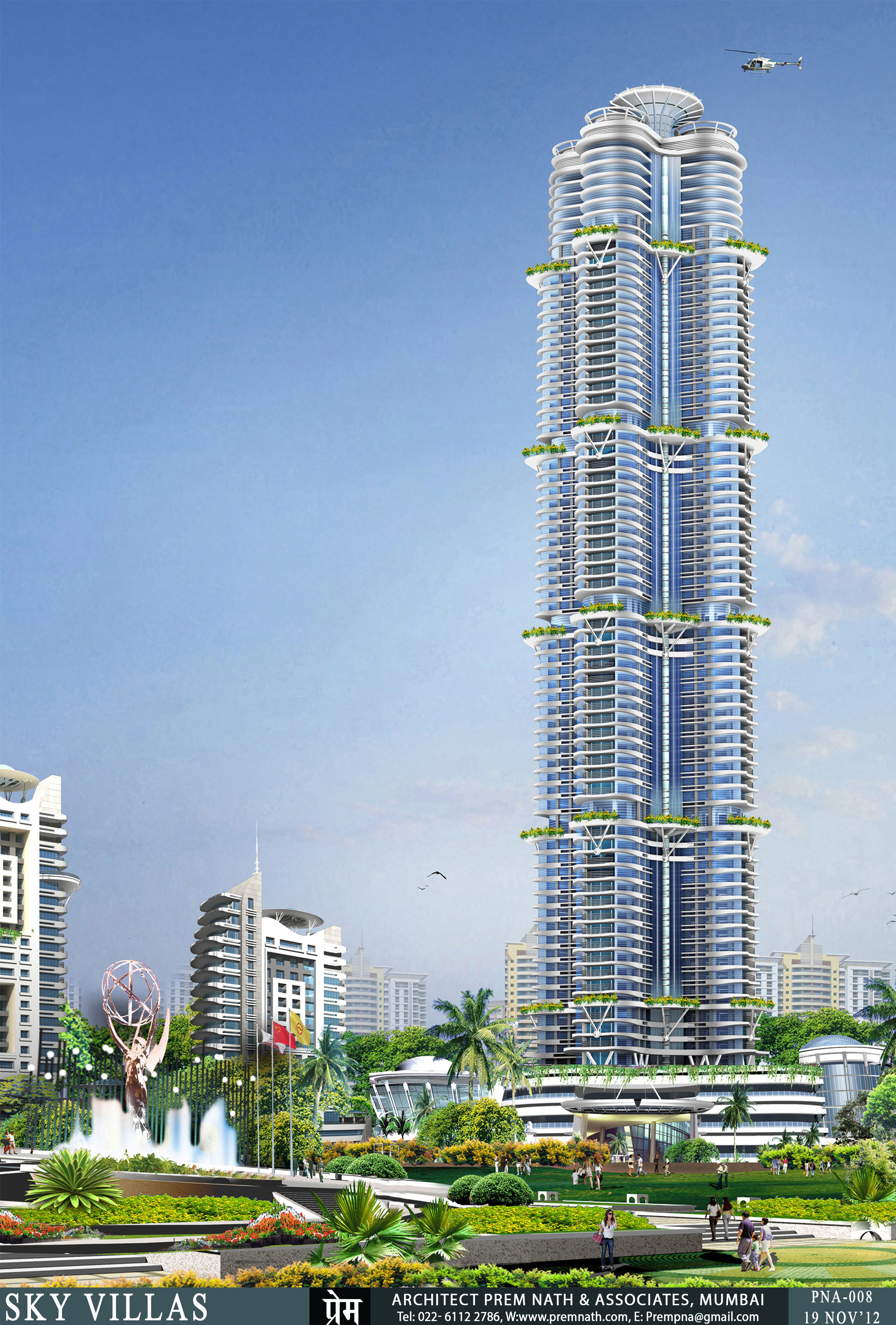
Sky-Villas, Mumbai

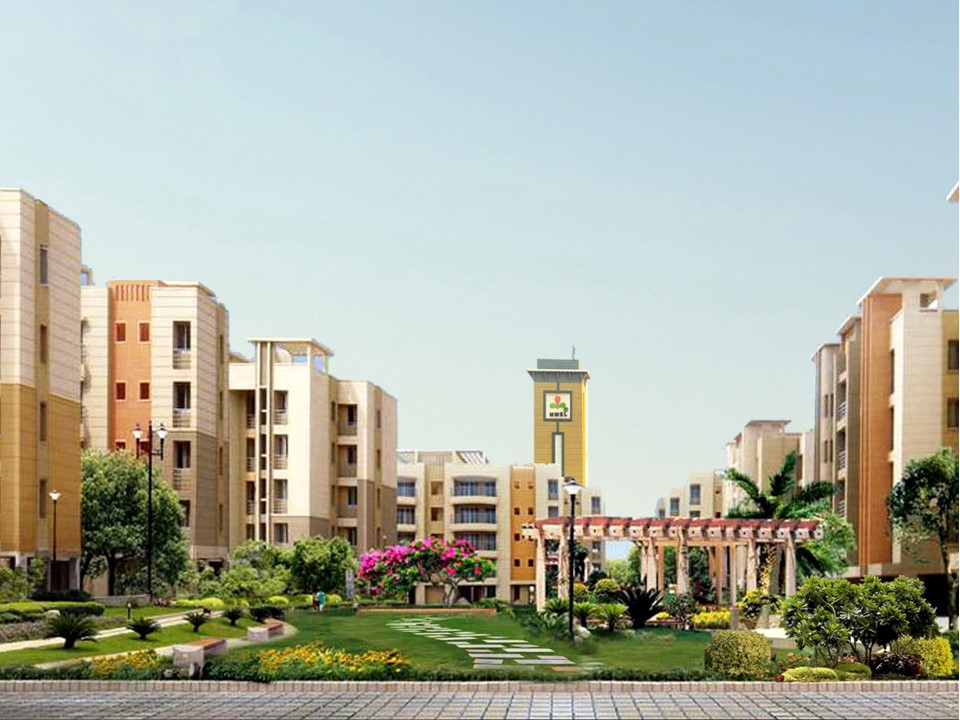
First Green rated Township, HMEL Bhatinda, Punjab
