= Jaipur–Kishangarh Expressway =

Road in India

Jaipur-Kishangarh Expressway
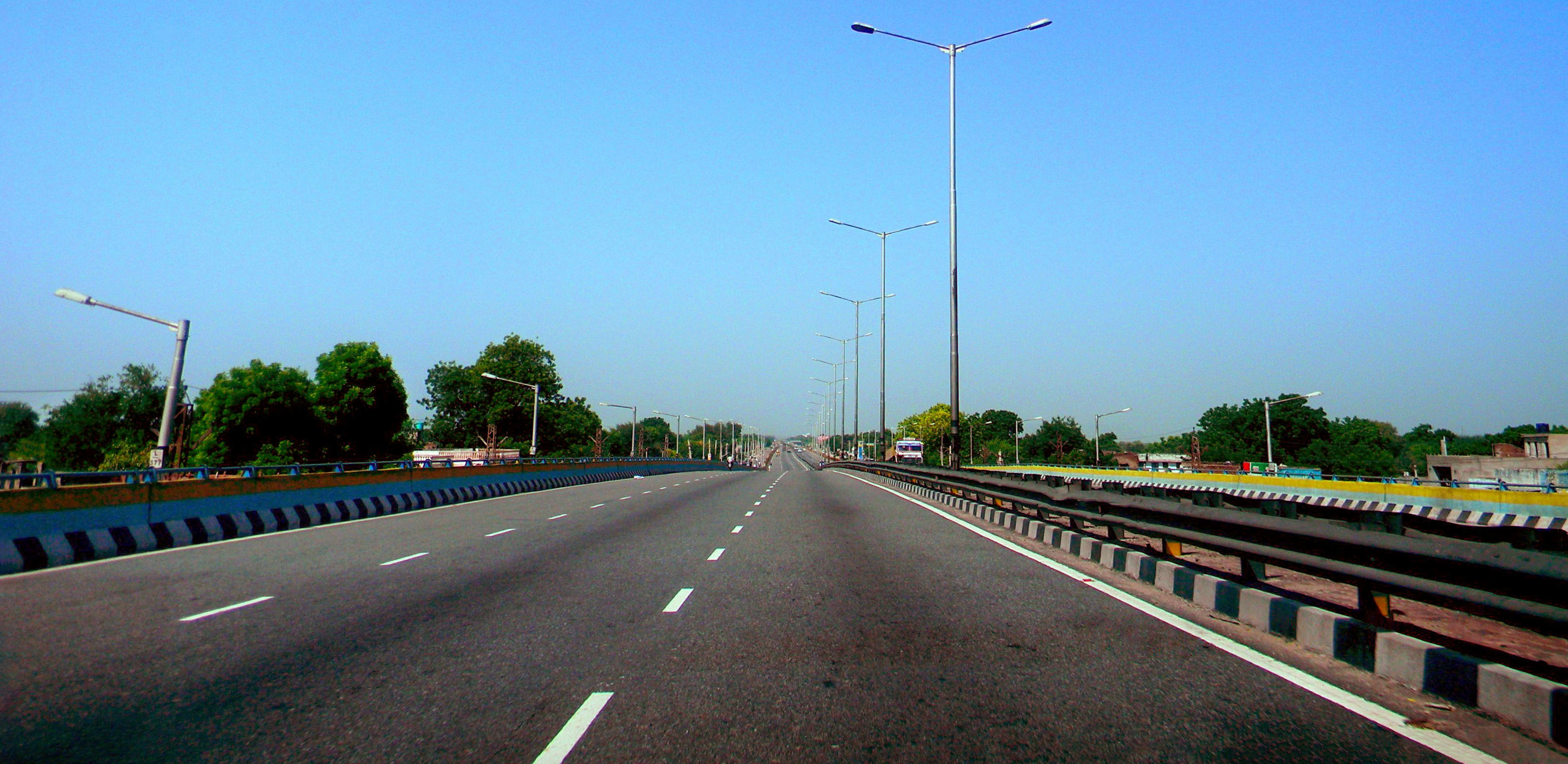

Route information
- Length: 90 km (56 mi)
- History: Completed in April 2005

Major junctions
- North end: Jaipur
- South end: Kishangarh

Location
- Country: India
- States: Rajasthan

Highway system
- Roads in India; Expressways; National; State; Asian

Jaipur-Kishangarh Expressway is a 90-kilometre-long (56 mi) access controlled toll expressway connecting Jaipur, the capital of the Indian state of Rajasthan, to Kishangarh. The expressway forms a segment of NH 48, which is a part of the Golden Quadrilateral project, which itself is a part of the National Highway Development Project (NHDP). The six-lane expressway was inaugurated in April 2005. Construction work was handled by GVK Jaipur Expressway Private Limited (GJEPL) under the build-operate-transfer model. Built at a cost of 7.29 billion INR, the expressway was the first Indian road built under the public-private partnership model.
