= Joshua Ashish Dawson =

Joshua Ashish Dawson is a film director & designer based in Los Angeles, California.

== Career ==
Dawson received a Master's in Advanced Architectural Studies from the University of Southern California. He was trained under Balkrishna Doshi (Pritzker Prize-winning architect) and Hollywood production designer Alex McDowell.

Joshua focuses on the potential impact of ecological devastation in the physical world.

In 2016, his Master’s thesis project, Cáustico, was a 4-minute short film that used matte paintings and archival news footage to explore the issue of water privatization. It screened at the National Museum of Australia in Canberra as a finalist in the AnthropoScene short film competition. In 2019 "Loa's Promise" his directorial debut, at the Cinequest Film Festival won the Jury prize for best Horror, Thriller, Sci-fi Short film. In 2020, he released "Denervation", a short film based on the perils of pharmaceutical counterfeiting.

In 2022 he released a 3-minute film titled "Spa Sybarite" which takes the form of a fictional ad about a "wellness spa in which users are offered treatments in response to the planet’s degrading environmental conditions."
