= Indian Concrete Institute =

- Abbreviation: ICI
- Formation: 7 September 1982
- Type: non-profit Organisation
- Purpose: It is dedicated to the cause of Disseminating Knowledge on Concrete, to Promote Concrete Technology and Construction and to address the Research Needs of Concrete.
- Headquarters: Gandhi Nagar, Adyar, Chennai, India
- Region served: 44 regional Centres
- Members: 13,000
- General Secretary: Er. R. Radhakrishnan Secretary General
- Website: indianconcreteinstitute.org

Indian Concrete Institute (ICI) is the national organisation of engineering professionals, employed in concrete construction and associated research in India. It was founded in 1982 in Chennai following a resolution in the International Seminar and Exhibition on 'Modernization of Concrete Practices' organised jointly by the Structural Engineering Research Centre (SERC) and Anna University.

The ICI imparts training to working professionals in changing technologies in concrete constructions, promote research work in concrete technologies, publish journals on research finding, newer technologies, and solution for practical problems, collaborate with agencies employed in concrete construction, research and associated manufacturers for better adoption of the technology by working professionals.
