= Mahindra World City =

Mahindra World City (MWC) is part of the USD 19.4 billion Mahindra Group, which is active in diverse markets including automotive, farm equipment, defense, hospitality, manufacturing, aerospace, retail, finance, real estate, and infrastructure. The organization maintains a presence in more than 100 countries.

== Integrated Cities - Locations ==
Mahindra World City, Chennai

Established in 2002, Mahindra World City Chennai is India’s first integrated business city and corporate India’s first operational SEZ and is promoted by the Mahindra Group in partnership with Tamil Nadu Industrial Development Corporation (TIDCO), spanning over 1,500 acres and comprising multi sector Special Economic Zones (SEZs) and a Domestic Tariff Area (DTA).

Mahindra World City, Jaipur

Established in 2006, Mahindra World City, Jaipur is a 74:26 joint venture between Mahindra Lifespace Developers Ltd.and the Rajasthan State Industrial Development and

Investment Corporation Ltd. (RIICO), an agency of the Government of Rajasthan. Spread over an area of 3,000 acres, MWCJ consists of a Multi-Product Special Economic Zone (SEZ), a Domestic Tariff Area (DTA) and Social & Residential Infrastructure Zone.

== Industrial Clusters - Locations ==
ORIGINS by Mahindra World City, Chennai

The Industrial Cluster will be spread over a total area of ~ 600 acres when completed, and the first phase of development spans over ~300 acres. The multi sector industrial cluster focuses on attracting large and medium global companies across engineering, automotive, logistics, medical devices and aerospace & defence among other sectors.

ORIGINS by Mahindra World City, Ahmedabad

ORIGINS by Mahindra World City near Ahmedabad has been launched in strategic partnership with International Finance Corporation (IFC), a member of the World Bank Group.

Spread across 340 acres, it will focus on attracting large and medium corporates across engineering, automotive, pharmaceutical, medical equipment, manufacturing, food processing, plastics, textile and Logistic & Warehousing, amongst other sectors.

== Recognition & Awards ==
The residential and social amenities zone at Mahindra World City, New Chennai designed by M/s HOK, USA, won two international awards for the ‘Mahindra World City’ master plan from the American Society of Landscape Architects (ASLA).
