= Paranur =

Neighbourhood in Chengalpattu district, Tamil Nadu, India

- village
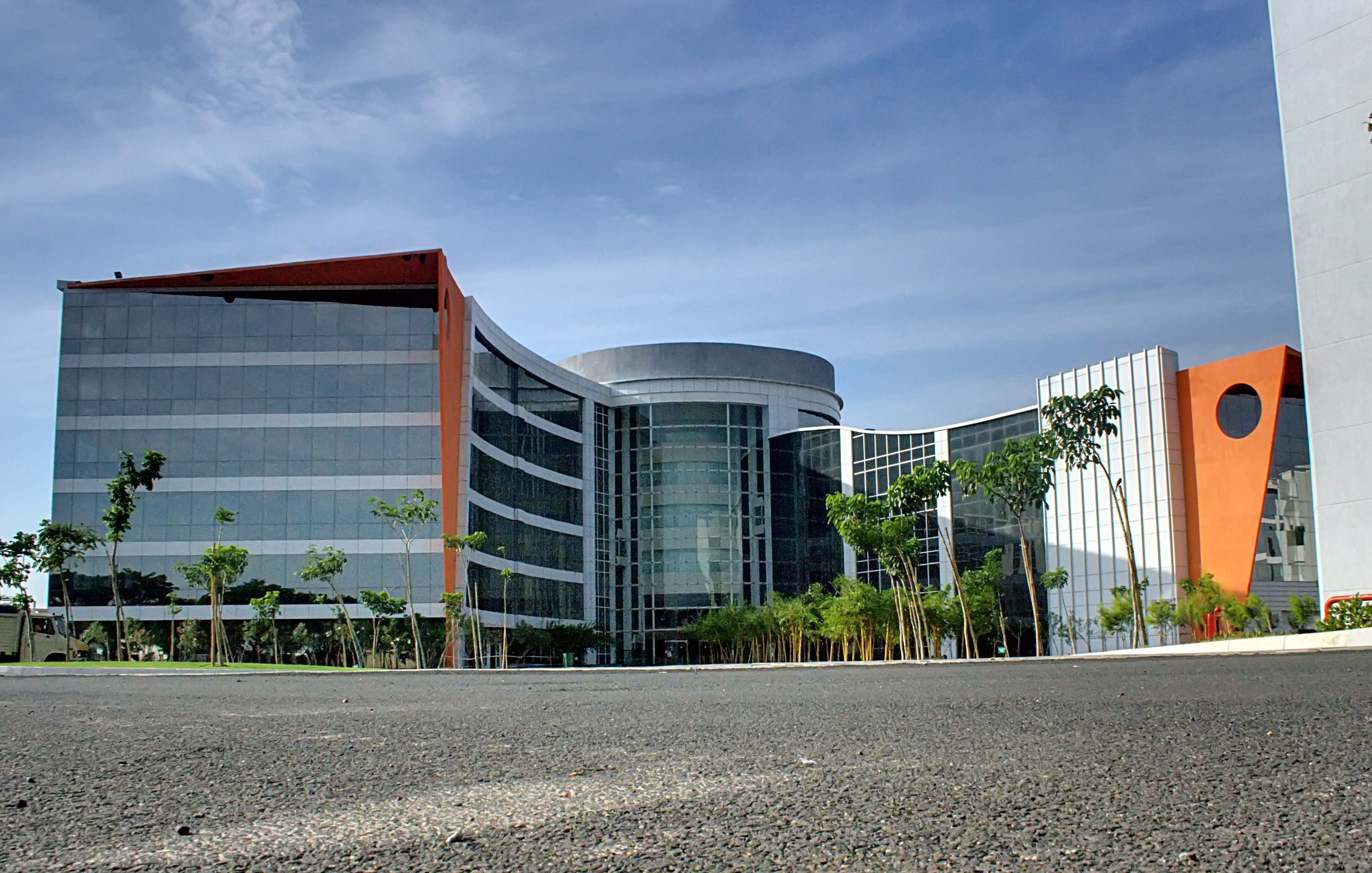
- The Infosys Building in Mahindra World City, New Chennai

- Location in Tamil Nadu, India Paranur (India)
- Coordinates: 12°43′44″N 79°59′23″E
- Country: India
- State: Tamil Nadu
- District: Chengalpattu

Area
  - Total: 1.12 km^{2} (0.43 sq mi)

Languages
  - Official: Tamil
- Time zone: UTC+5:30 (IST)
- PIN: 603002
- Telephone code: +91-44
- Vehicle registration: TN-19

Paranur is a village in India near the busy GST Road or National Highway 45. It has a railway station and few hundred houses, and is 44 km from Chennai International Airport in Tirusulam. Paranur comes under Panchayat union/block of Kattankulathur, and Panchayat Raj under Veerapuram. Paranur has been a special economic zone (SEZ) since October 2005. Paranur comes under the Chennai Metropolitan Area (CMA).
