= Udayan Chinubhai =

Indian businessman

Sir Chinubhai Madhowlal Ranchhodlal, 3rd Baronet of Shahpur, commonly known as Sir Udayan Chinubhai Baronet (25 July 1929 – 3 September 2006), was the 3rd of Runchorelal baronets, a businessman, a noted sportsman and a Commandant General of the Gujarat Home Guards from Ahmadabad, Gujarat, India.

== Life-sketch ==
=== Early life and marriage ===
Udayan Chinubhai was born in an affluent and distinguished family of Runchorelal baronets and was the eldest son of Sir Girjaprasad Chinubhai Madhowlal Ranchhodlal, 2nd Baronet and Lady Tanumati.

He graduated with Bachelor of Arts degree from University of Bombay and soon joined his family business of textile mills. He married Muneera (Muneera Khodad Fozdar) in 1953 and had issue, including one son.

=== Businessman ===
He shouldered responsibilities of the textile business owned by their family, with his father Sir Girjaprasad, soon after graduating from University.

Later on, he also earned a name as real estate developer in Ahmadabad city.

=== Sportsman ===
He was an avid shooter and in 1961 he won a gold medal in the National Championship in the pistol revolver section and retained this title for 14 years. He retired from the active sports in 1974. During this period he represented the country four times in international competitions and won a silver medal. He won medals in center fired non-prohibited bore and also prohibited bore sections. After his retirement from the active sports, he was appointed a member of the Gujarat Sports Council and was also the founder President of the Gujarat State Rifle Association.

He was awarded Arjuna Award in 1972 in the field of shooting.

He was also a cricket player and played in Ranji trophy tournaments and also represented the combined universities of India against Pakistan in 1952.

=== Commandant, Home Guards ===
When Gujarat was formed in 1960, Morarji Desai, who was then Chief Minister of Bombay State, invited Udayan Chinubhai to take charge as Commandant General of the Gujarat Home Guard’s, a voluntary organization. He served in this organization in a voluntary capacity for 28 years. The Home Guards, which had a strength of 6000 at the time of its inception in 1960 had expanded to a strength of 42000 at the time of his retirement in 1987. During his tenure, he offered invaluable services, particularly at the time of the 1962 Chinese aggression, 1965 and 1971 wars with Pakistan, the Morvi dam disaster and other natural disasters, calamities and riots. During President's Rule and Emergency, he was given additional charge of honorary Director of Civil Defence.

In recognition of his meritorious voluntary service in Home Guard’s and Civil Defense he was awarded the highest honor with the President of India Medal for bravery and distinguished services.

=== Baronet ===
In 1990, after death of his father Sir Girjaprasad, he succeeded him as Sir Chinubhai Madhowlal Ranchhodlal, 3rd Baronet of Shahpur.

=== Philanthropy ===
In the latter part of his life, he devoted his time and money for philanthropic works as patron of Gujarat College and for expansion of Victoria Jubilee Hospital both started by his ancestors.

=== Death ===
He died on 1 September 2006 at Ahmadabad. The Governor of Gujarat, noted his works for the State in his condolence message.

His son Prashant Chinubhai, succeeded him as Sir Chinubhai Madhowlal Ranchhodlal, 4th Baronet.

== See also ==
- Sir Chinubhai Baronet
- Ranchhodlal Chhotalal

Baronetage of the United Kingdom
Preceded by Girjaprasad Chinubhai	Baronet (of Shahpur); 1990–2006	Succeeded by Prashant Chinubhai
