= Geography of Ahmedabad =

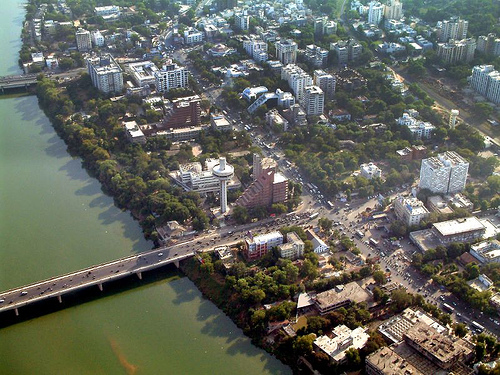
Amdavad

Ahmedabad is located on the banks of the River Sabarmati in the northern part of Gujarat and the western part of India. It is located at 23.03°N 72.58°E spanning an area of 550 km^{2}. The average elevation is 53 metres.

There are two main lakes located in the city limits – the Kankaria lake, and the Vastapur lake. Kankaria lake, located in Maninagar, is an artificial lake developed by Muhammad Shah II in 1451. It also has an aquarium and a zoo. In the middle of the lake is an island palace named Naginawadi, built during the Mughal era. The city is located in a sandy and dry area. Except for the small hills of Thaltej-Jodhpur Tekra, the entire city is almost flat. The Sabarmati bifurcates the city into eastern and western parts, connected by five bridges, two of which were constructed after independence. Though the river is perennial, it gets dried up in the summer, leaving only a small stream of water flowing.

There are typically three main seasons – summer, monsoon and winter. Barring monsoon, the climate is very dry. The weather is very hot during the months of March to June with the average summer temperature ranging from maximum 43 °C to minimum 23 °C. The months of November to February have an average maximum temperature 36 °C and a minimum of 15 °C. The climate is extremely dry during that period. Cold northerly winds are responsible for a mild chill during January. The south-west monsoon winds bring humid climate to Ahmedabad from mid-June to mid-September. The average rainfall is 932 mm. The highest temperature recorded is 50 °C and the lowest is 5 °C.

Ahmedabad is divided by the Sabarmati into two physically distinct areas. The eastern bank of the river houses the old city which has packed bazaars, a pol system of houses, and many places of worship like temples and mosques. The old city also houses the main railway station and the General Post Office. The colonial period saw the expansion of the city to the western side of Sabarmati facilitated by the construction of Ellis Bridge in 1875. This part of the city houses educational institutions, modern buildings, well-planned residential areas, shopping malls, multiplexes and new business districts centred on the C.G. Road, Ashram Road and more recently the Sarkhej-Gandhinagar Highway.

Sabarmati Ashram, also known as Gandhi Ashram, is located on the Western banks of Sabarmati River, in Northern Ahmedabad, was the residence of Mahatma Gandhi, and it was from there that he started the Dandi March in 1930. This ashram originally was established in the Kochrab area of Ahmedabad in 1915. In 1917 it was shifted to the present place. It also is known as Harijan Ashram, or Satyagraha Ashram. It was the scene of many events of the Indian independence movement.
