= Girjaprasad Chinubhai =

Indian businessman and activist (1906–1990)

Sir Chinubhai Madhowlal Ranchhodlal, 2nd Baronet of Shahpur, commonly known as Sir Girjaprasad Chinubhai Baronet (19 April 1906 – 1990) was an Indian businessman, an independence activist and social reformer from Ahmadabad, Gujarat, India.

== Life ==
He was born on 19 April 1906 to Sir Chinubhai Madhowlal Ranchhodlal, 1st Baronet and Devlaxmi Sarabhai. He was educated at Gujarat College and later at University of Bombay. In 1924, he married Tanumati, daughter of Jahaverilal Mehta and had issue.

He succeeded his father, Sir Chinubhai Madhowlal's legacy and textile business, who died in 1916. In mid 1920s he came in contact with Mahatma Gandhi, Sardar Patel and other leading Indian independence activist and was actively involved in the movement at Gujarat front. He was also a member of Bombay Legislative Assembly from 1937 to 1939.

He continued philanthropic works of his father and remained as main patron of Gujarat College, Victoria Jubilee Hospital and other institutions, during his lifetime.

Later, under influence of Mahatma Gandhi and other social leaders like Jamnalal Bajaj, ( although, their family being staunch Nagar Brahmin) he and his mother threw open doors of their family's personal temple (known as Sir Chinubhai's Temple) to Dalit and all communities. The opening ceremony of this was done by Mahatma Gandhi at a function on 2 August 1931, which was attended by at least 300 people.

However, after independence of India, he decided to live secluded and peaceful life away from politics. He spent time managing affairs of family owned textile mill. He died in the year 1990, at an age of 86, at his home, the Sir Chinubhai Mansion in Ahmadabad. He is survived by three sons, of whom the eldest, Udayan, became the Sir Chinubhai Madhowlal Ranchhodlal, 3rd Baronet.

== See also ==
- Ranchhodlal Chhotalal

Baronetage of the United Kingdom
Preceded by Chinubhai Madhavlal	Baronet (of Shahpur); 1916–1990	Succeeded by Udayan Chinubhai
