= Gujarat Vidya Sabha =

Institute in Ahmedabad, Gujarat, India

Gujarat Vidya Sabha, originally called Gujarat Vernacular Society, is a literary institution for the promotion of vernacular Gujarati literature and education, and for the collection of manuscripts and printed books; located in the city of Ahmedabad, India. It was founded by a British administrator, Alexander Kinloch Forbes, in 1848 with the Gujarati author Dalpatram. The name was changed on the occasion of the centenary of the institution.

It published Gujarat's first newspaper, established the first Gujarati school for girls, the first library and the first Gujarati periodical.

== History ==
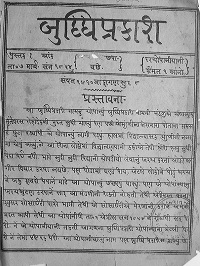
Buddhiprakash, Gujarati periodical, 1850

Vartaman, Gujarati newspaper, 1849

Gujarat Vernacular Society was founded by British East India Company administrator, Alexander Kinloch Forbes on 26 December 1848 along with Dalpatram. The fund of Rs 9601 was raised from locals, Baroda State and British officers. The society had in 1877 a fund of £2791 (Rs. 27,910), of which £1000 (Rs. 10,000) were contributed by Premchand Raichand of Bombay. The first newspaper in Gujarat was started in Ahmedabad by this society. It was a weekly paper issued on Wednesday, Budhvar, and hence in Ahmedabad all newspapers were called Budhvariya during those times. In 1849 the Native Library was established for members which mainly contained English books. The nagarsheth of Ahmedabad Himabhai had donated a large amount of money for the construction of the library and in 1857 it was converted into the Himabhai Institute.

The first girls' school in Ahmedabad. were established by the help of this society. Useful books were printed by it, and the publication of others was helped by money grants. It brought out a monthly magazine, Buddhiprakash, which in 1876 had a monthly sale of 1250 copies. The magazine is still published. The society helps libraries in all parts of Gujarat and Kathiawar, and gives prizes to schools. It undertakes to sell and distribute books, and offers annual prizes for essays on various useful subjects. A yearly prize of £15 (Rs. 150) is given for the best Gujarati essay on a given subject, the funds coming from an endowment of £250 (Rs. 2500) made in 1864 by a Bombay merchant, Sorabji Jamsedji Jijibai. Its library contained (1877) 1590 volumes in various languages. At the close of 1876 there were forty-eight life members, two yearly members, and two honorary members. Its yearly receipts amount to about £180 (Rs. 1800) and its expenditure to £129 (Rs. 1290).

The textile pioneer of Gujarat, Rao Bahadur Ranchhodlal Chhotalal, donated money to the Gujarat Vernacular Society to start a girls' high school, which was started in 1892 and was named RB Ranchhodlal Chhotalal Girls High School after the donor.

In 1939, the society's president Anandshankar Dhruv instituted the Department of Postgraduate Education and Research with a donation of 2 lakh rupees from Bholabhai Jeshingbhai and since 1946 functions as the Sheth Bholabhai Jeshingbhai Institute of Learning And Research.

The society changed its name to Gujarat Vidya Sabha in 1946.

H.K. (Harivallabhdas Kalidas) Commerce College was founded by the GVS in 1968.

Premabhai Hall is owned by the Gujarat Vidya Sabha.

== Notable members ==
- Alexander Kinloch Forbes
- Dalpatram
- Ranchhodlal Chhotalal
- Ambalal Sakarlal Desai
- Keshavlal Dhruv
- Ramanbhai Nilkanth
- Mahatma Gandhi (honorary)
- Anandshankar Dhruv
- Vidyagauri Nilkanth
- Ganesh Vasudev Mavalankar
- Rasiklal Parikh
- Chinubhai Chimanlal
- Keshavram Kashiram Shastri

== See also ==
- Gujarati Sahitya Parishad
- Gujarat Sahitya Sabha
- Gujarat Sahitya Akademi
