= Ahmedabad Spinning and Weaving Company Limited =

Indian textile mill and garments company

The Ahmedabad Spinning and Weaving Company Ltd. was the first textile mill and garments company established in Ahmedabad and one of the first textile mills of India. It was opened on 30 May 1861, and started by entrepreneur, Ranchhodlal Chhotalal.
