= Barrow Helbert Ellis =

Sir Barrow Helbert Ellis, KCSI (24 January 1823 – 20 June 1887) was an Anglo-Indian civil servant who held several prominent posts in India during the time of British colonial rule.

== Education ==
Ellis, born in London on 24 January 1823, was the son of S. Helbert Ellis – a prominent member of the Jewish community in London – and Fanny Ellis, daughter of Samuel Lyons de Symons. Educated at University College School, he matriculated at the University of London in 1839 and went to Haileybury. There he distinguished himself in all branches of study, and left in 1843 as senior student to enter the civil service of Bombay.

== Career ==
His first appointment in India was as third assistant-collector and magistrate of Ratnagiri district; he was promoted to the post of second assistant in 1847, and in 1848 was made commissioner for investigating certain claims upon the Nizam's government. In 1851, Ellis arrived in Sindh as assistant-commissioner, and from 1855 to 1857 was in charge of the offices of chief commissioner during the absence in England of Sir Henry Bartle Frere. He was made special commissioner for jagirs or alienated lands in the province, before leaving Sindh in 1858. In 1859, he was collector and magistrate at Bharuch district, and, after serving as chief secretary of the Bombay government, was nominated an additional member in 1862 and an ordinary member in 1865 of the Bombay council. Five years later, he was promoted to the Viceroy's council.

== Later life ==
In 1875, Ellis returned to England, and was made not only K.C.S.I. but a member of the Council of India in London. He took a prominent part in the affairs of the Jewish community of London, being vice-president of the Anglo-Jewish Association and of the Jews' College, where a portrait has since been placed. He published a report on education in Sindh (Bombay, 1856), and edited George Stack's Dictionary of Sindhi and English (Bombay, 1855). He was an active member of the Royal Asiatic Society, which he joined in 1876, and founded a prize in Bombay University; a scholarship there was established in his honour in 1875. In 1885, he retired from the Indian council, on whose deliberations he had exerted much influence. He died at Evian-les-Bains, France, on 20 June 1887, and was buried in the Jewish cemetery at Willesden, Middlesex, on 28 June.

Ellis was highly regarded by his contemporaries; Sir George Birdwood described him as "one of the ablest revenue officers of the Bombay Presidency". While at Bombay, Ellis was exceptionally popular with all classes of native Indians. He was at all times accessible to them, both in India and England, and the native newspapers eulogised him unstintedly at the time of his death. He left a sum of 2,500l. in trust for the poor of Ratnajiri, his first official charge. He was not married.

The Ellis Bridge in Ahmedabad, Gujarat was named after him.
