= Himmatlal Dhirajram Bhachech =

Indian civil servant

Rao Bahadur Himmatlal Dhirajram Bhachech (1844 – 30 September 1922) was a civil engineer in the PWD (Public Works Department) of British India.

Bhachech was born into a Brahmin family of Ahmedabad, Gujarat belonging to Nagar sub caste His father, Dhirajram, died when he was ten years old. Although his family struggled with poverty, he received financial assistance that helped him complete his studies. He received a bachelor of engineering degree from the University of Bombay thru College of Engineering, Pune.

Bhachech worked as engineer in the PWD for many years. In 1892 he was credited with the re-building of the Ellis Bridge of Ahmadabad, which was originally built in 1869. Himmatlal reconstructed the bridge at a cost of only Rs. 407,000/-which was significantly below projected budget of Rs. 500,000/- that led the British government to suspect he was using poor quality building materials. An inquiry committee eventually recognised his construction as better than the original work and subsequently honoured him for saving the country money.

Bhachech was honoured in 1893 with title of 'Rao Bahadur' by the Viceroy of India, Lord Lansdowne.

He was president of Ahmadabad Municipalityin the 1890s and consulted in the construction of Gujarat College, Ahemedabad, in 1897.

Himmatlal died on 30 September 1922.

In 1979, a street in Ahmedabad was named in his honour as Engineer Himmatlal Dhirajram Street.
