= RB Ranchhodlal Chhotalal Girls High School =

School in Ahmedabad, India

Coordinates: 23.0236534°N 72.5917946°E

RB Ranchhodlal Chhotalal Girls High School is a girls high School in Ahmedabad, Gujarat, India. It is one of the oldest girls schools in the country.

== History ==
The school was started by Gujarat Vernacular Society in 1892. It was named as RB Ranchhodlal Chhotalal Girls High School, after the chief donor, the textile-mill pioneer of Gujarat, Rao Bahadur Seth Ranchhodlal Chhotalal It was not only the first girls school of the town but also of Gujarat. The school was guided by noted women activist Vidyagauri Nilkanth in first half of 20th century.
