= Gujarat College =

College in Ahmedabad, India

Coordinates: 23.0219°N 72.5633°E

Gujarat Arts and Science College
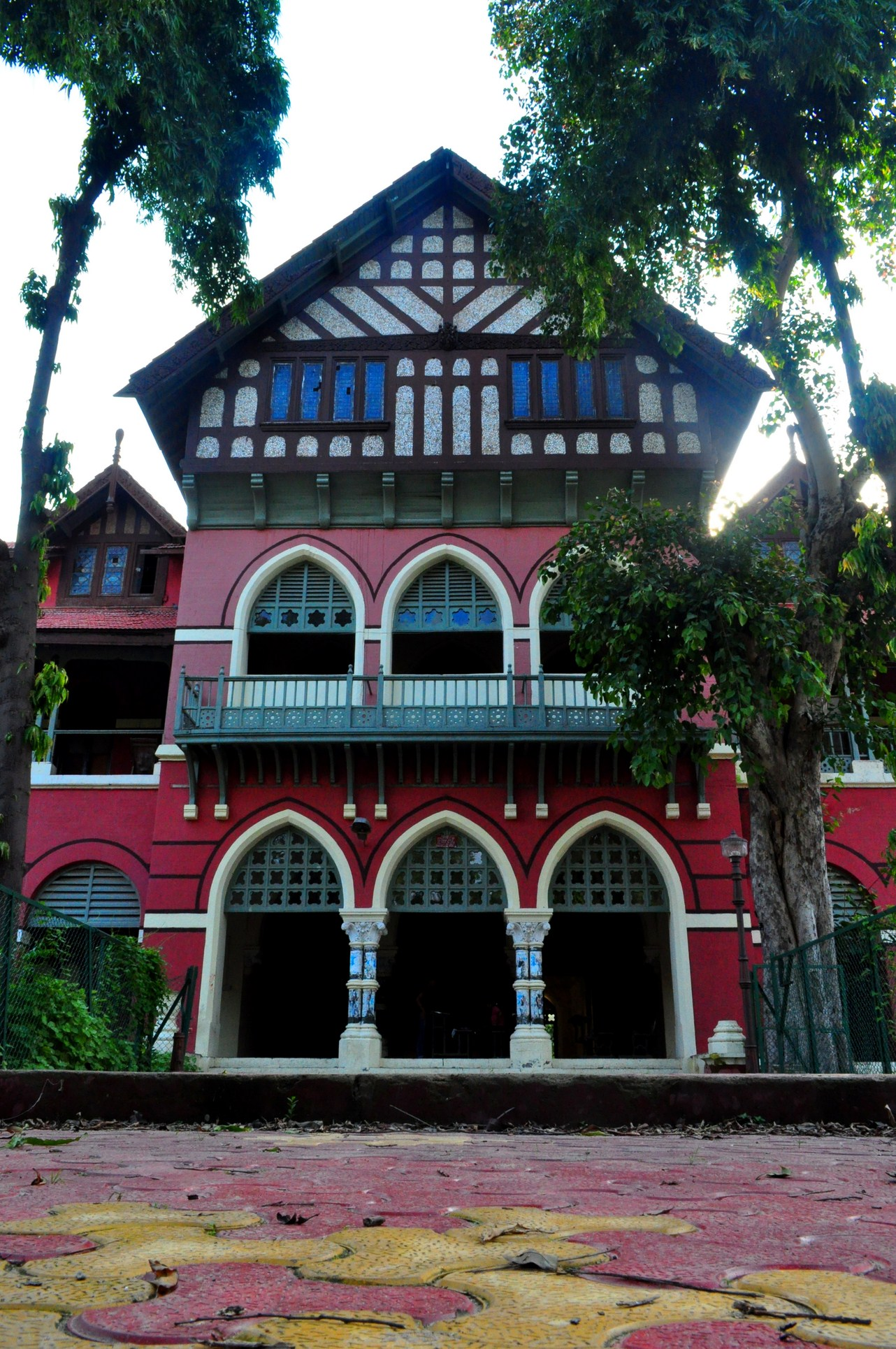
- Main entrance of the college building
- Former names: Gujarat Provincial College; Gujarat College
- Type: Undergraduate College
- Established: 1860; 166 years ago
- Affiliations: Gujarat University
- Principal: Dr. P. B. Solanki
- Location: Ahmedabad, Gujarat, India
- Website: gasc.gujarat.gov.in

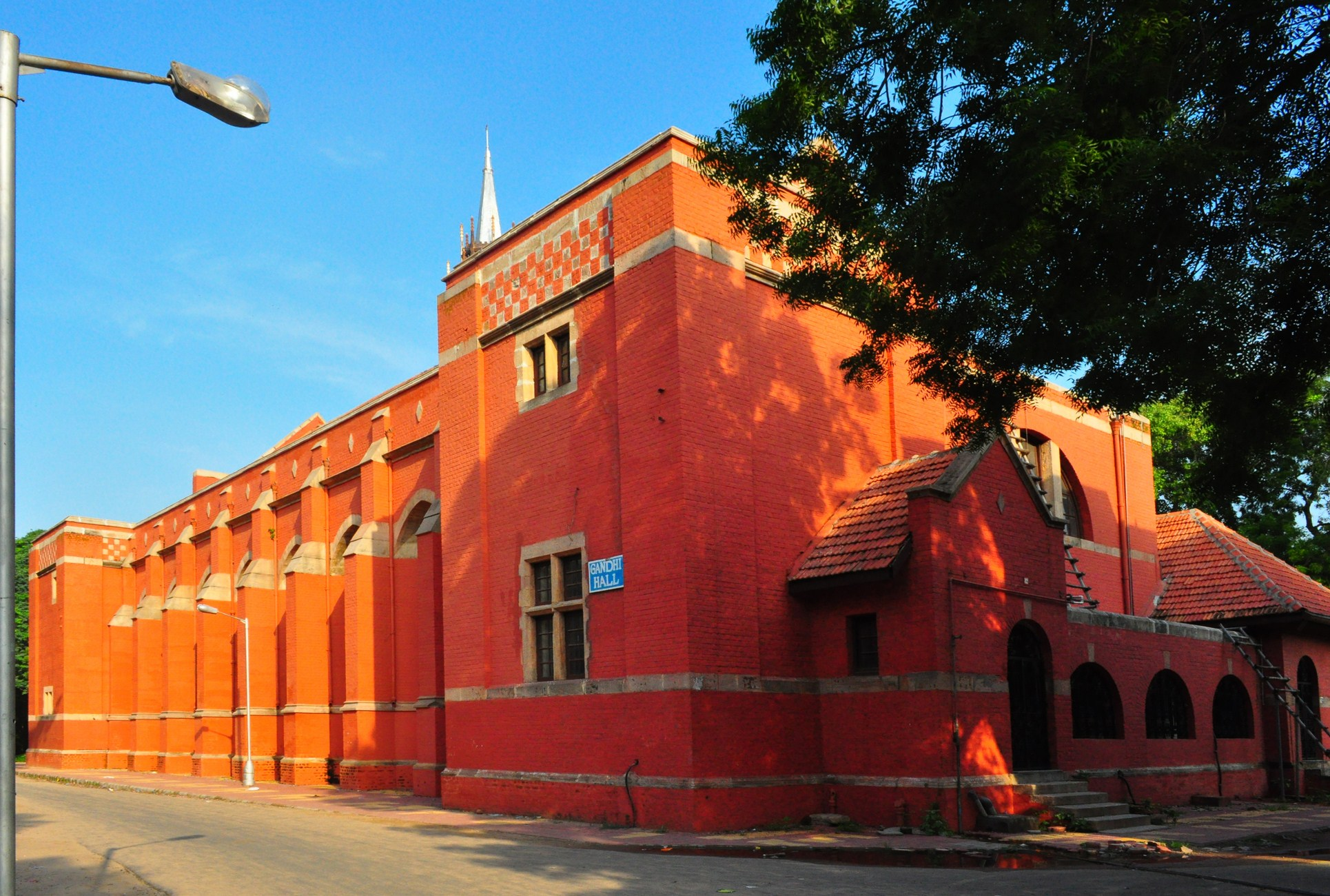
College building

Gujarat Arts & Science College, popularly and previously known as Gujarat College, is one of the oldest educational institutions of India and the second arts and science college of Gujarat, near Ellis Bridge, Ahmedabad. It was founded in 1845 as a government-run educational institute, was established as a regular college in 1860, and is now under the direct management of the Education Department of the Government of Gujarat.

== History ==
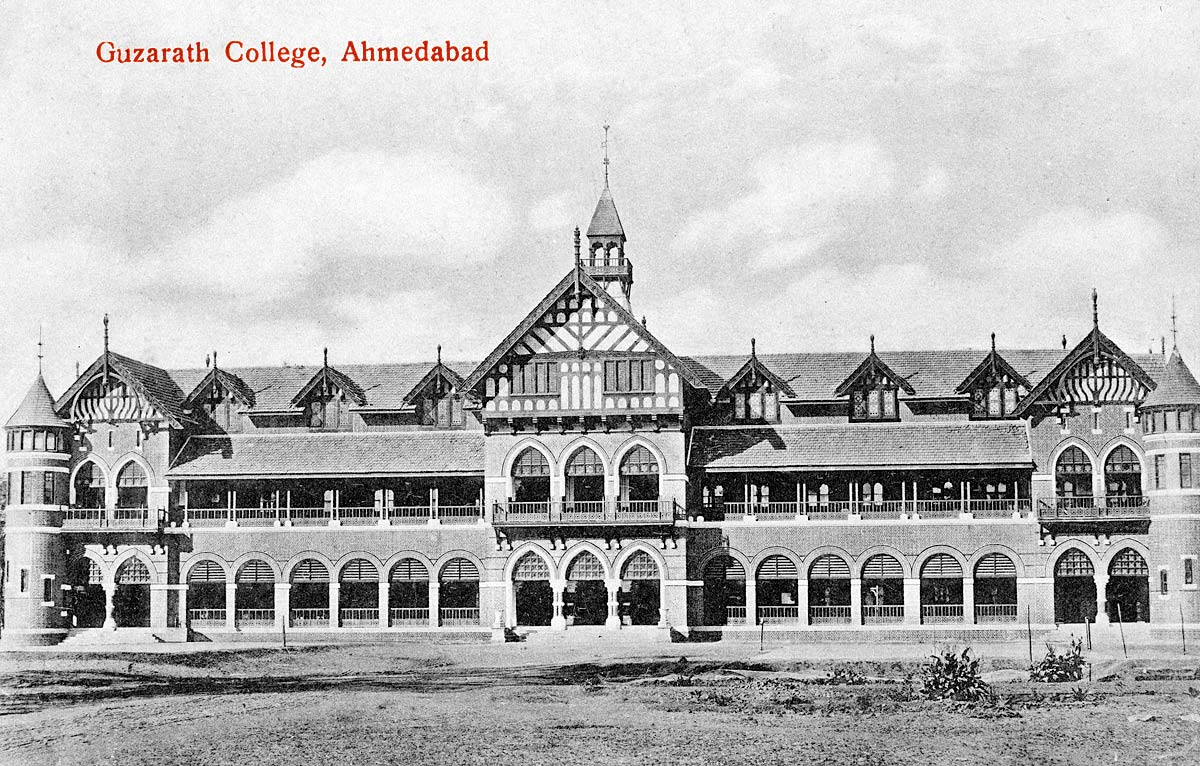
Gujarat College in 1908

Gujarat College started as a small educational institution in 1860 due to efforts of Theodore Cracraft Hope, who inspired local people for charity, which led to the start of the institution. Thus the institute was started in 1860 as Gujarat Providential College but ceased to work in 1872. However, after a gap of five years it was restarted in 1879 as Gujarat College under management of the Gujarat College Committee, which at that time was under the able leader ship of local textile magnate, Rai Bahadur Sheth Ranchhodlal Chotalal. Later his grandson and philanthropist Sardar Sir Chinubhai Madhavalal Bert, ICE in 1897 came forward and donated 33 acres of land along with generous cash donations worth millions of rupees for the expansion of Gujarat College. To mention, in the year 1897, he donated ₹6 lakh (US$6,200) and further ₹20 lakh (US$21,000) for the construction of Arts College to which he further added a sum of ₹1.5 lakh (US$1,600) for a library and college hall. The buildings that came up from these donations were Madhavlal Ranchodlal Science Institute named after father of Sir Chinubhai, Sydenham Library and George V Hall, which all were inaugurated by Lord George Sydenham Clarke in 1912, 1915 and 1917, respectively. The Engineer, Rai Bahadur Himmatlal Dhirajram Bhachech, who was President of Ahmadabad Municipality at that time, overlooked the construction of college buildings. The first college building was constructed in the year 1897, which followed more buildings appearing on the land using the generous flow of donations by Sir Chinubhai Madhavalal, Bert, ICE, who again donated another sum of ₹10 lakh (US$10,000) as patron of college .

After Independence of India, the college continued to expand and the New Science Building was built in 1948, Tutorial Building in 1965, and Science Workshops in 1965.The Department of Dramatics was established in 1970–71.

== Present status ==
The college houses departments of Arts faculty, departments of science and a full-time degree course in drama. The institute also runs many undergraduate courses.

The institute is managed by the Commissioner for College and Universities under the State Department of Education.

== Affiliation ==
The college started with affiliation from University of Bombay, which was granted in March 1879. Later when Gujarat University at Ahmedabad came into existence it granted its affiliation to Gujarat College and since then the college is affiliated to Gujarat University.

== Indian Independence Movement ==
Mahatma Gandhi held an historic meeting at Gujarat College campus under the presidency of V.J. Patel on 28 September 1920 and addressed a huge mass of students asking them to join Non-cooperation Movement, giving detailed description of atrocities committed by British regime on Indians. This led to many professors and students leaving college, as it was government run institution and joining Gujarat Vidyapith, which was started by Gandhi in 1920.

During the Quit India Movement in 1942, many students of college participated organizing a rally and shouting slogan against British, which led to death of one student of college named Vinod Kinariwala, who was shot dead by English policeman inside college campus, on 10 August 1942. Later in 1947, Veer Vinod Kinariwala Memorial was inaugurated by Jai Prakash Narayan in memory of his martyrdom inside college campus.

== Notable alumni ==
- Vinod Kinariwala - independence activist
- Nautam Bhagwan Lall Bhatt - physicist
- Indulal Yagnik - independence activist, writer and filmmaker
- Kasturbhai Lalbhai - industrialist
- Ambalal Sarabhai - industrialist
- Umashankar Joshi - poet, writer
- Disha Vakani - television actress
- Girjaprasad Chinubhai Madhowlal - later the Sir Chinubhai Madhowlal Ranchhodlal, 2nd Baronet of Shahpur.
- G. V. Mavlankar - politician, the first speaker of Lok Sabha
- Nanalal Dalpatram Kavi - poet.
- Vikram Sarabhai - scientist.
- Anandshankar Dhruv.
- Vidyagauri Nilkanth -author, social activist, wife of Ramanbhai Nilkanth, one of the first women graduates from Gujarat.
- Vishnuprasad Trivedi - Gujarati literary critic
- Ranjitram Mehta - Gujarati author
- Radheshyam Sharma - Gujarati author
- R. M. Kantawala - former Chief Justice of the Bombay High Court
- Uttamlal Trivedi - Gujarati writer

== Notable faculty ==
- M.V. Rajadhyaksha - Marathi writer and critic
- Prahalad Chunnilal Vaidya - physicist and mathematician
- Dhirendra Mehta - Gujarati novelist, poet, commentator
- Dhirubhai Thaker- Gujarati writer and critic
- Anandshankar Dhruv - Gujarati scholar, writer, educationist and editor
- Gatubhai Gopilal Dhru - biographer, translator and writer
