= Ranchhodlal Chhotalal Technical Institute =

Technical institute in Gujarat, India

- Motto: तमसो मा ज्योतिर्गमय
- Motto in English: From Darkness, Lead us into Light
- Type: Government of Gujarat Institute
- Established: 1910
- Affiliations: Gujarat Technological University
- Principal: P. A. Raval(Since 2022)
- Location: Ahmedabad, Gujarat, India
- Campus: Urban
- Website: www.rcti.cteguj.in

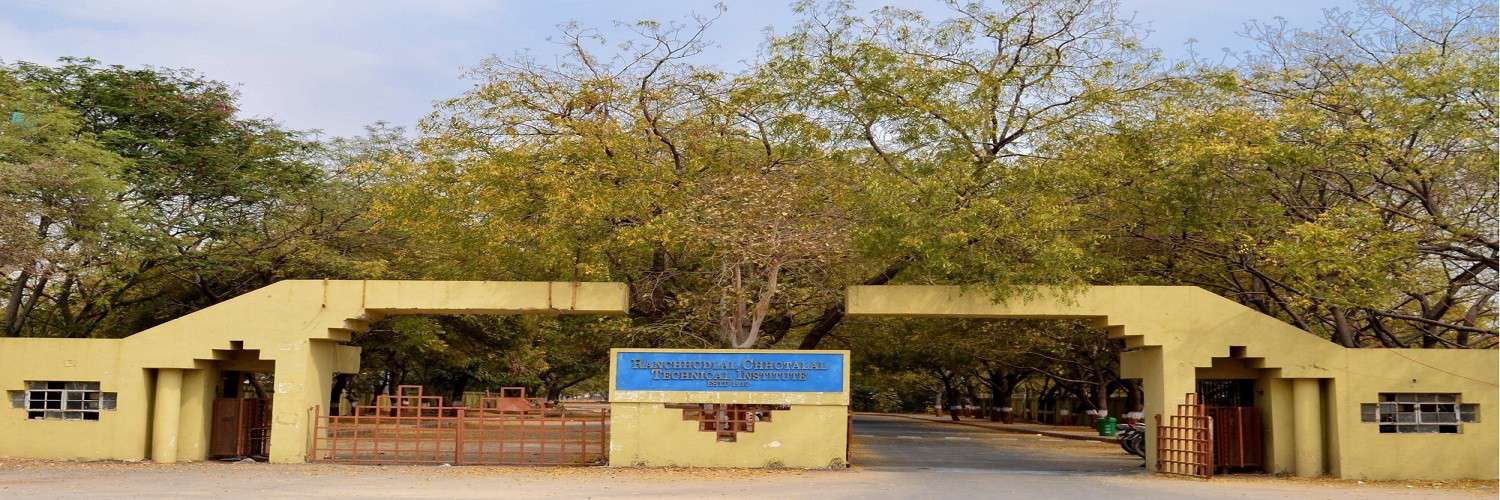
Main Entrance of R C Technical Institute

Ranchhodlal Chhotalal Technical Institute (R C Technical Institute) was established in the memory of Shri Ranchhodlal Chhotalal, Rai Bahadur CIE by his grandson Chinubhai Madhowlal Ranchhodlal, in the year 1910 at Saraspur, Ahmedabad Gujarat India.

Sir Chinubhai Madhowlal Ranchhodlal was the first Hindu Indian to be made baronet by the British regime. He was a kind person and a great philanthropist and he donated huge amount of money for educational purposes, which led to many educational institutions foundations.

Today, Ranchhodlal Chhotalal Technical Institute (R C Technical Institute or RCTI), is a government diploma engineering institute functioning under Directorate of Technical Education, Gujarat.

== History ==
The institute is named after the Rai Bahadoor Ranchhodlal Chhotalal (The First Nagarpati and pioneer of textile industry in India). Ranchhodlal was one who bought textile revolution in India. He set up many textile mills in Ahmedabad which gave the city its moniker "Manchester of the East". He has his great contribution in the field of education as he established many educational institutions in the city.

The R C Technical Institute was established by Sir Chinubhai in memoir of his grandfather, Ranchhodlal in the year 1910 at Saraspur, Ahmedabad, which provided certificate programs at that time in various disciplines including textile spinning, electrical, mechanical, etc. Later in the year 1930, this institute was handed over to the then State Government of Bombay. Initially, the institute was running certificate programs in Mechanical, Electrical, Textile Spinning, Textile Weaving and Textile Processing. In the year 1947, these certificate programs were replaced by new Diploma programs in Textile Manufacturing and Textile Processing.

Looking to the need of industries, the programs like Printing technology, Mechanical Engineering, Electrical Engineering, Computer Engineering, IT Engineering & Civil Engineering etc. were added gradually. To accommodate this expansion in environmentally clean and larger area, the institute is shifted to the new campus at Sola, Ahmedabad in June 1997.

=== Former principals ===
- B Tayabali (1930 to 1946)
- T A Desai (1946 to 1954)
- J A Rathod (1954 to 1959)
- A U Shenoy (1959 to 1965)
- C L Parmar ( 1965 to 1966)
- N G Sahatrabuddhe (1966 to 1967)
- J A Rathod (1967 to 1977)
- K S S Naik ( 1977 to 1981)
- S S Patel (1981 to 1983)
- M M Patel (1983 to 1984)
- K D Vyas ( 1984 to 1986)
- S P Thakkar ( 1986 to 1990)
- K S Patel (1990 to 1992)
- V J Raiyani (1992 to 1997)
- K S Patel (1997 to 1999)
- C A Patel (1999 to 2001)
- L F Rajput (2001 to 2003)
- B K Ray (2003 to 2004)
- A G Modi (2004 to 2005)
- V A Patel (2005 to 2009)
- V N Soni ( 2009 to 2011)
- P A Raval (2011 to 2015)
- B B Soneji (2015 to 2022)

== Academics ==
=== Programs ===
The institute offers diploma in eight different programs such as:

- Civil engineering (NBA Accredited Program)
- Computer engineering (NBA Accredited Program)
- Electrical engineering (NBA Accredited Program)
- Information technology
- Mechanical engineering (NBA Accredited Program)
- Printing technology
- Textile manufacturing technology
- Textile processing technology

=== Admissions ===
Students are admitted to diploma courses through merit based system on the basis of result of 10th board and there is also provision of admission for ITI certificate holders to diploma programs (C To D) in Civil, Computer, Electrical, IT and Mechanical engineering. The admission procedure is central for all the diploma courses in the state and is conducted by Admission Committee for Professional Diploma Courses (ACPDC).

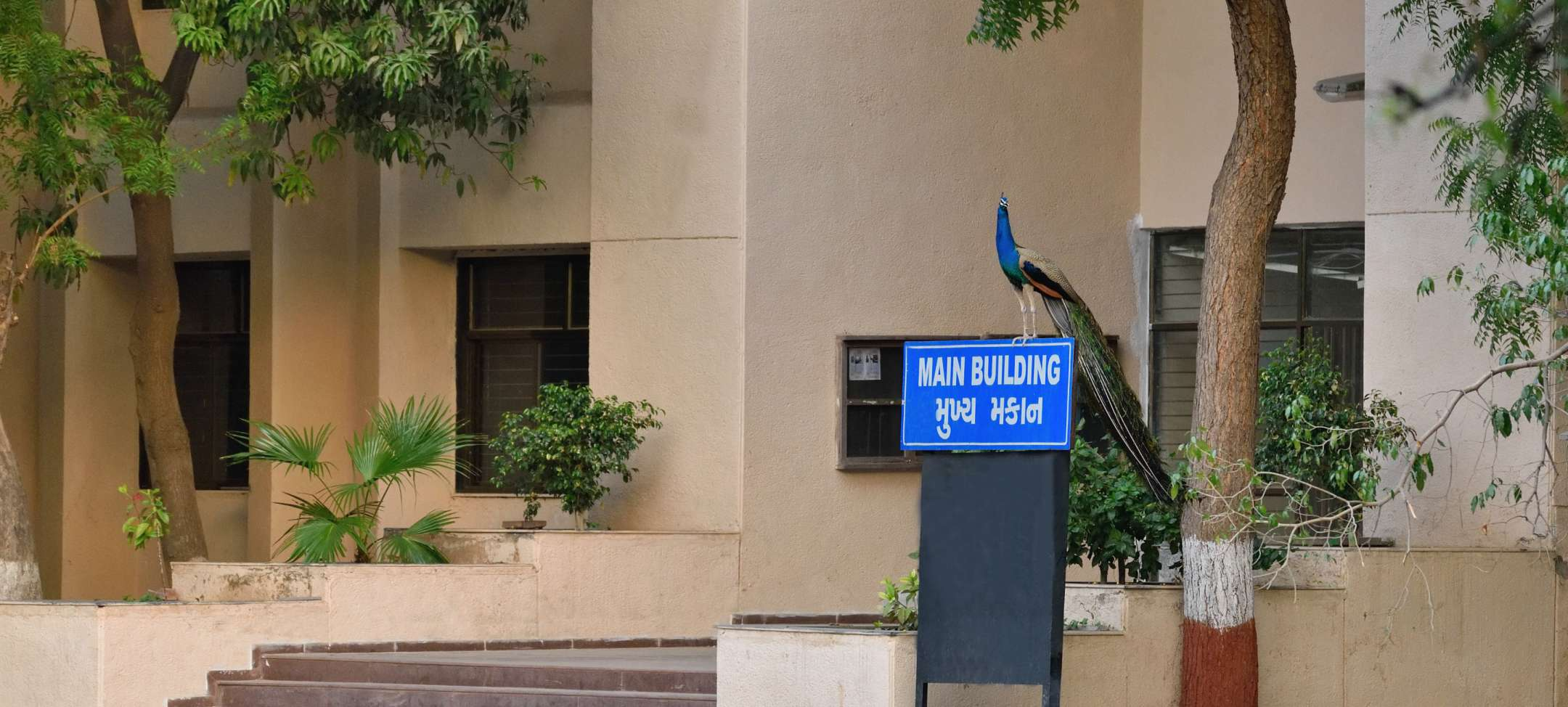
Main Building of Campus

== Campus ==
The campus of R C Technical institute is spread in 19 acres (7.7 ha) with 15,224 m^{2} (163,870 sq ft) built-up area for classrooms, laboratories, library, workshops, learning resource users center, amenity hall, boys’ hostel with mess, girls’ hostel, staff quarters, etc.

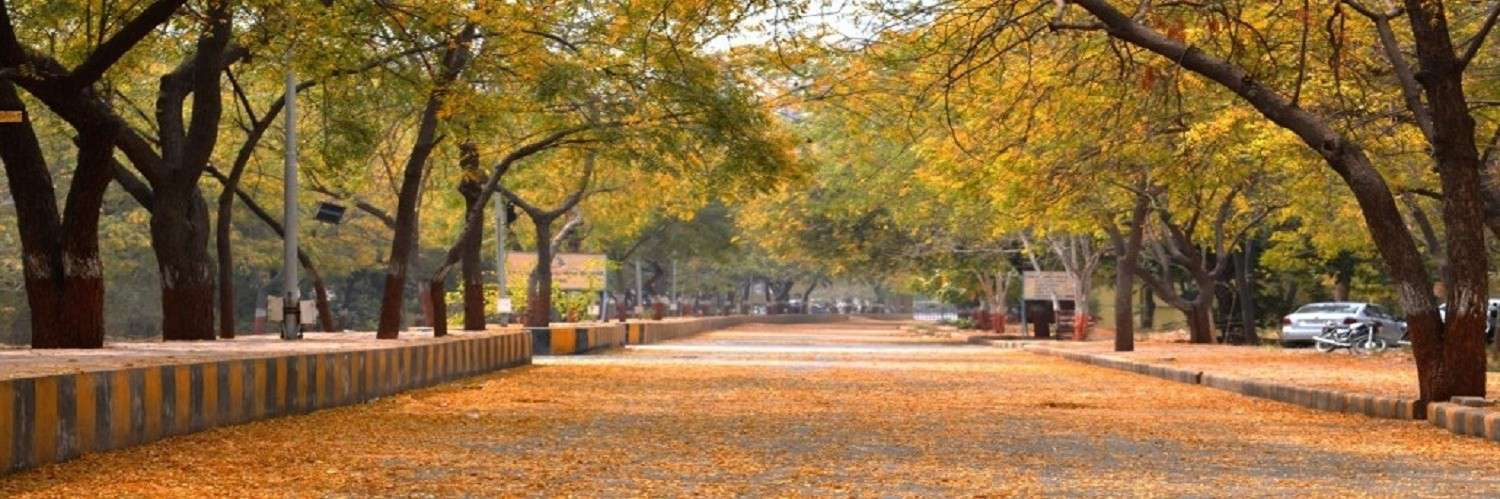
Campus Internal Road

== Facilities ==
=== Laboratories ===
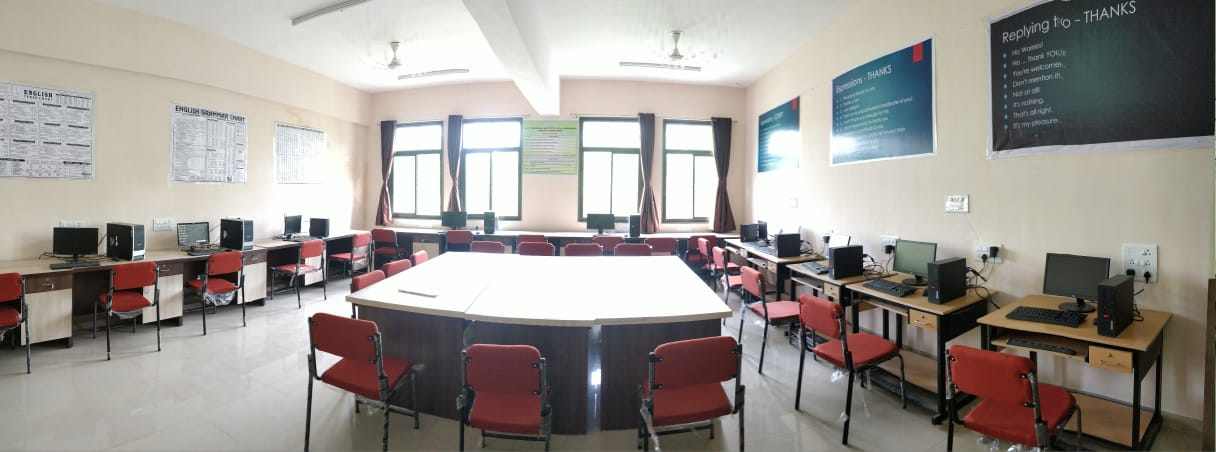
Language Lab

Each department has modern, fully equipped laboratories. New laboratories of the institute are constantly being established in emerging areas. In addition to the students, the laboratories also cater to industrial testing in diverse fields. The campus offers free internet facility to its students & faculty.

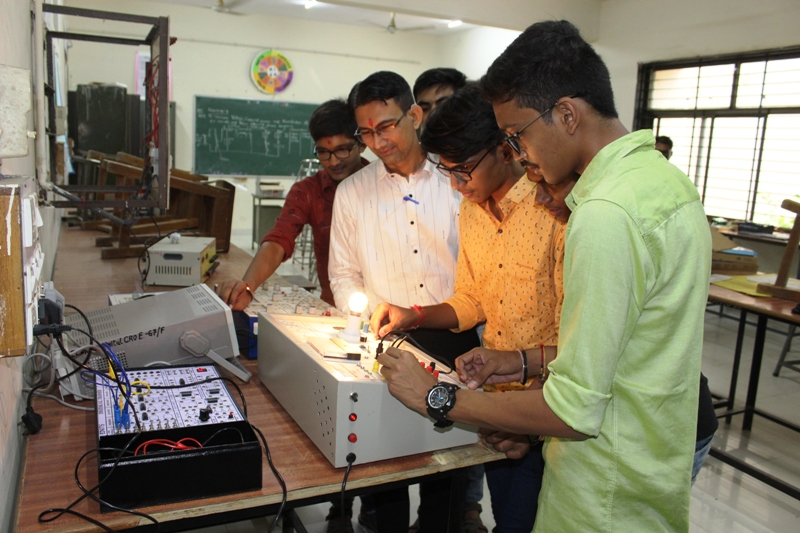
Electrical Laboratory

=== Workshops ===
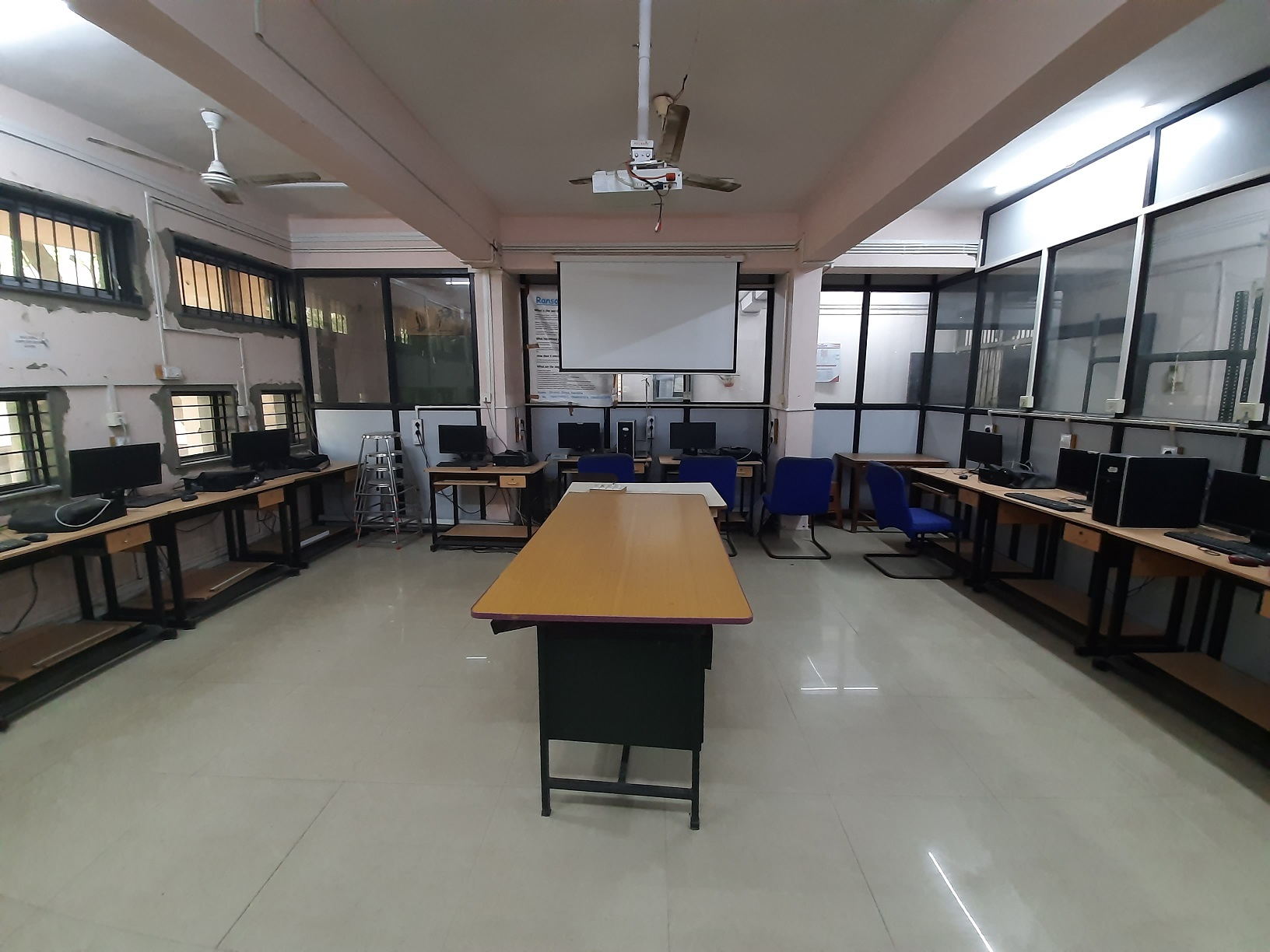
Web Development Lab

The workshop is equipped to teach and demonstrate students the basic operations of manufacturing and production. It is equipped with a CNC machine, an electro-discharge machine, and measuring instruments. The institute has a thermal workshop in which boilers and other thermal equipment can be studied.

=== Library ===
The library has total 24208 books, 939 e-books, 28 Periodicals/Journals including international journals. It has also developed e-Granthalaya facility for students and faculties.

=== Training and placement cell ===
The cell at the institute trains the students for facing personal interviews successfully and supports enhancing their interpersonal skills developing their interview skills. The training and placement cell invites many reputed industries (like Suzuki, Amul, Tata industry, Coca-Cola, Mafatlal industries, Daikin, torrent power, Gujarat gas, Navneet, Arvind, L & T Construction, etc.) to conduct interviews for final year students in the campus. Many students get job offer through the cell.

=== Student Start-up & Innovation Centre (SSIP) ===
Students’ start-up and innovation centre is developed in the institute with different objectives to provide mentoring support for identification of primary research areas, motivate students to work on novel ideas, provide financial support and mentoring for projects, along with providing mentoring support and financial support for patent filing. It also assists students to establish their own enterprise. SSIP cell has supported total 23 projects and out of that 1 project have been selected for patent for the institute so far.

=== Finishing School ===
Finishing school Training in RCTI Ahmedabad is active since 2018.7 batches of students comprising 400 students have completed this training so far.80 hours of training by professional trainers are imparted to students which include Functional English, Life skills and employ-ability skills to the students.

=== Students Amenity Centre (SAC) ===
Student Amenity Centre provides an open space to students for engaging themselves in extra curricular activities and some sports like badminton, table tennis, chess, etc.

=== Hostels ===
The institute is facilitated with Boys hostel and a Girls hostel. The accommodation procedure in the hostel is merit based.

== Student life ==
=== Gymkhana ===
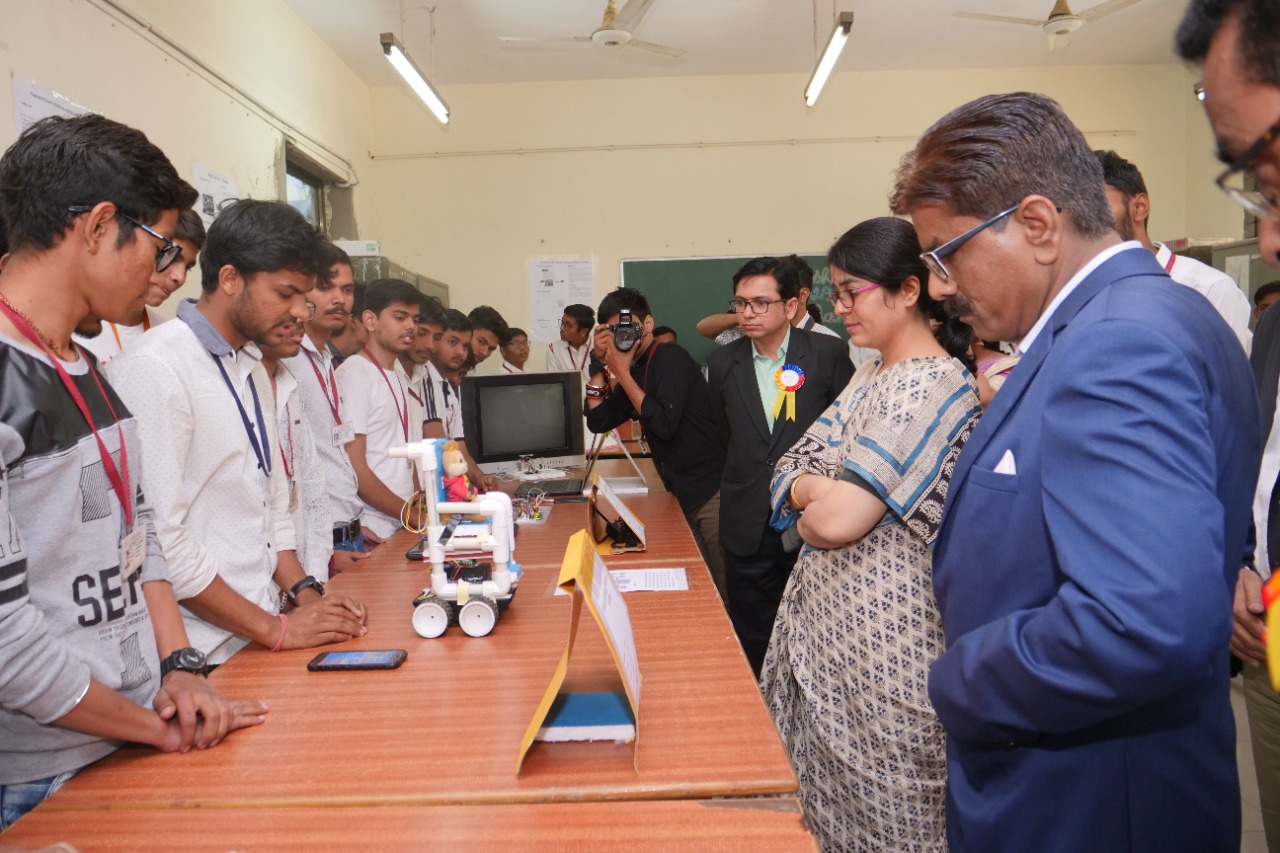
Model making In Aavishkar event

Every year Gymkhana organizes various events mainly Aavishkaar and R C Annual Sports Event (RCASE). Aavishkaar is organized since 2016 and is a technical event of the institute which includes various technical events like Robo Race, Robo War, Collage making as their main central event, while all the departments of the institute organize technical quiz, model making, etc. in which many students actively participate. R C Annual Sports Event is planned every year and includes all the indoor and outdoor sports activities like- Volleyball, Relay race, Archery, Kho-Kho, Chess, musical chair, one minute game, etc.

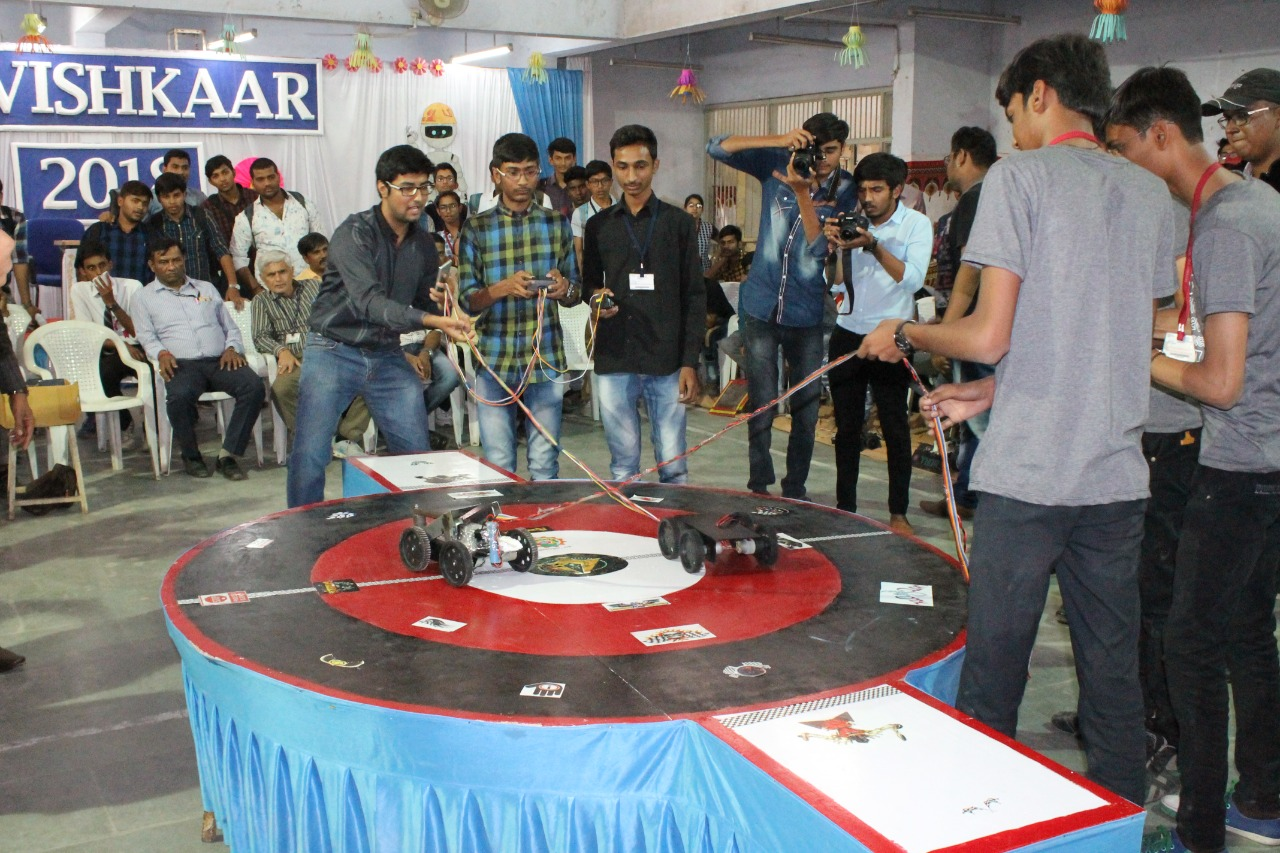
Robo-War at Aavishkar event

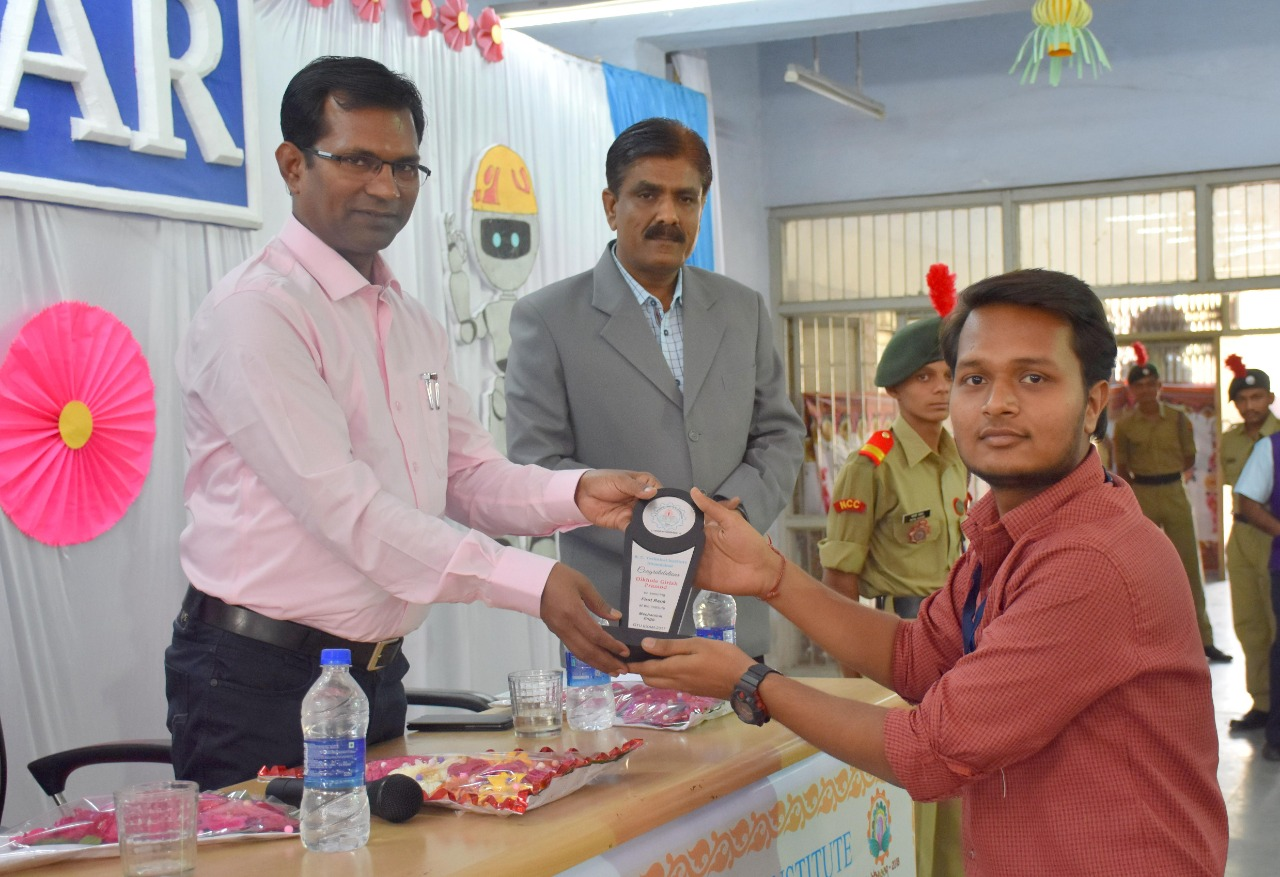
The then Director of technical education Hon. K K Nirala Sir felicitating a student in Aavishkar event.

=== NSS ===
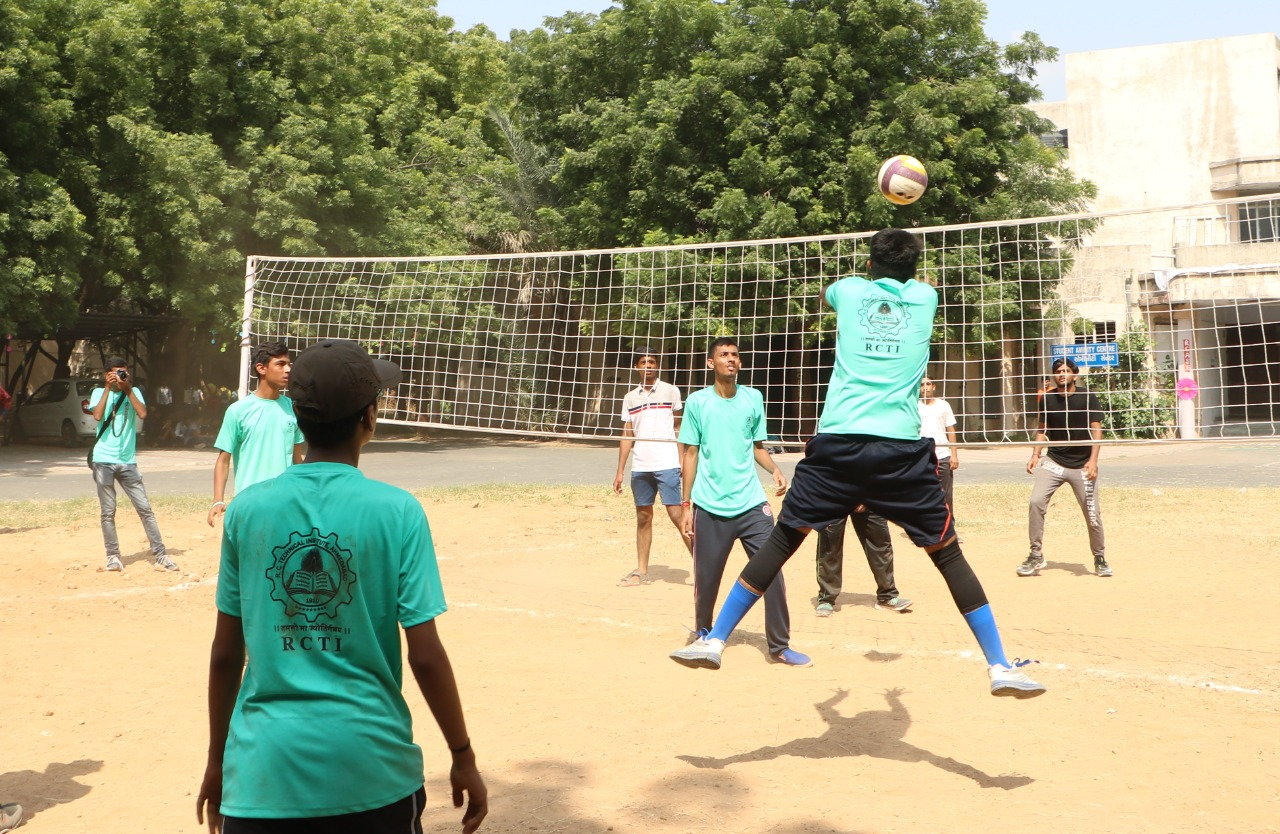
Volleyball Event in RCASE

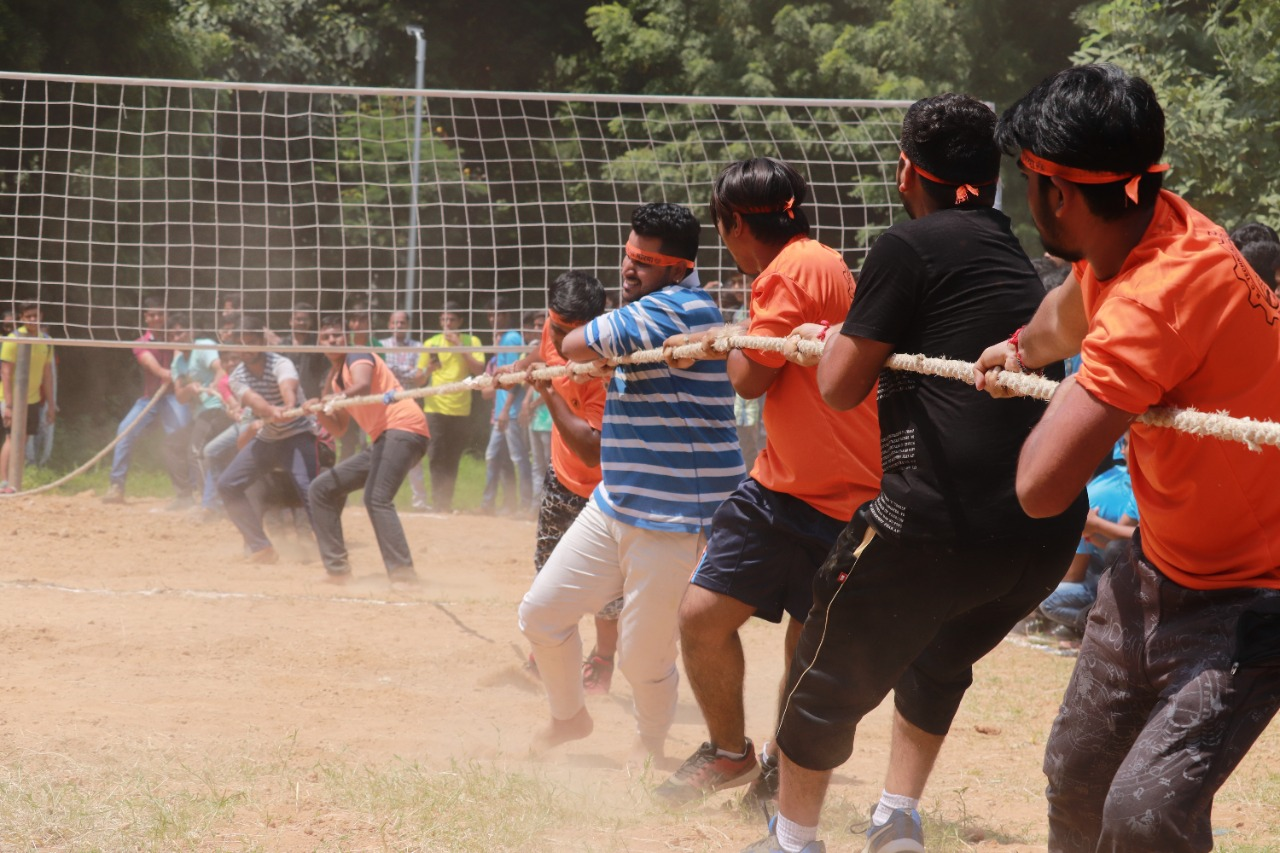
Tug of War event in RCASE

The institute offers students voluntary to join NSS and engage themselves in social activities around. Many different social activities are designed by the NSS team from blood donation, to tree plantation and various other social work too.

SPARCS (Society for Promoting Art of Revolutionary Charkha)

The institute have developed a unit called SPARCS (Society for promoting art of revolutionary charkha) to inculcate Gandhian philosophy among the students. Specifically in this unit students are taught to make yarn by charkha, the main tool of Gandhiji's non-violence movement. For smooth running of this the institute have procured few charkhas so that students can try their hands on it in their convenient time.

=== NCC ===
The NCC is the largest uniformed youth organization in India. Students from institute can join NCC on a volunteer basis as senior cadets for three years. After undergoing institutional training and various camps the successful cadets are awarded "C" certificates at the end of third year examination. Cadets in NCC are given a chance to attend training on Service subjects, Social service & community Development, Disaster Management, Attachment training with Army/ Air Force / Navy, Sports & Adventure activities. Every year various activities are performed by cadets of the institute at the institute and at NCC Unit.

=== Hobby clubs ===
In order to develop some extra curricular skills among the students the institute runs various hobby clubs like Literature club, Photography club, Painting club, Nature club.

=== Alumni Association of R C Technical Institute (AARC) ===
With a view to strengthen the bond between industry & institute for Student-Institute centric activities like- to conduct Industrial visits, Industrial tours, expert talks, student placements and interactions with industry and academia experts, to inculcate entrepreneurship quality and skills among the students, institute development activities and many more, an Alumni Association of the institute as "Alumni Association of R C Technical Institute" (abbreviated as AARC) is formed at the institute.
