= Vinod Kinariwala =

Vinod Kinariwala (20 September 1924 – 10 August 1942) was an Indian independence activist from Ahmedabad, India. He was shot dead by a British officer while waving the Indian flag in front of Gujarat College on 9 August 1942, the first day of the Quit India movement started by Mahatma Gandhi. The British officer asked him to drop the flag Refused to do so. He was later shot dead by an officer. He was 18 years old at the time of his death.

== Biography ==
Vinod Kinariwala was born on 20 September 1924 to Jamnadas Kinariwala and Hiralaxmi. He completed his schooling from St. Xavier's High School Loyola Hall in Ahmedabad and was one of its top students. He was an intermediate student at Gujarat College in Ahmedabad, India. The Quit India Movement led by Mahatma Gandhi launched on 9 August 1942. The next day a rally was organised by the students of Law College. The rally reached Gujarat College where other students joined them. The police started a lathi charge to disperse the rally. Kinariwala was shot dead by British Assistant Superintendent Police for trying to hoist the Indian flag while protesting in front of the college. He was taken to Vadilal Sarabhai Hospital where he was declared dead by the doctors. His dead body was taken to home and immediately cremated before being taken into custody by the police.

== Legacy ==
In 1947, Veer Vinod Kinariwala Memorial was inaugurated inside college campus by Jai Prakash Narayan in his memory. The memorial was designed by Ravishankar Raval. It depicts a youth taking the bull by its horns symbolizing the youth against the British Empire. It also depicts an arm with an Indian flag and broken handcuff symbolizing the independence movement. Every year on 9 August, the All India Democratic Students Organization pay tribute at his memorial.

The road where he died is named after him as Shahid Veer Kinariwala Marg. The new library of Gujarat College is named after him.
