= Ambalal Sakarlal Desai =

Indian writer, translator, lexicographer, and judge (1844–1914)

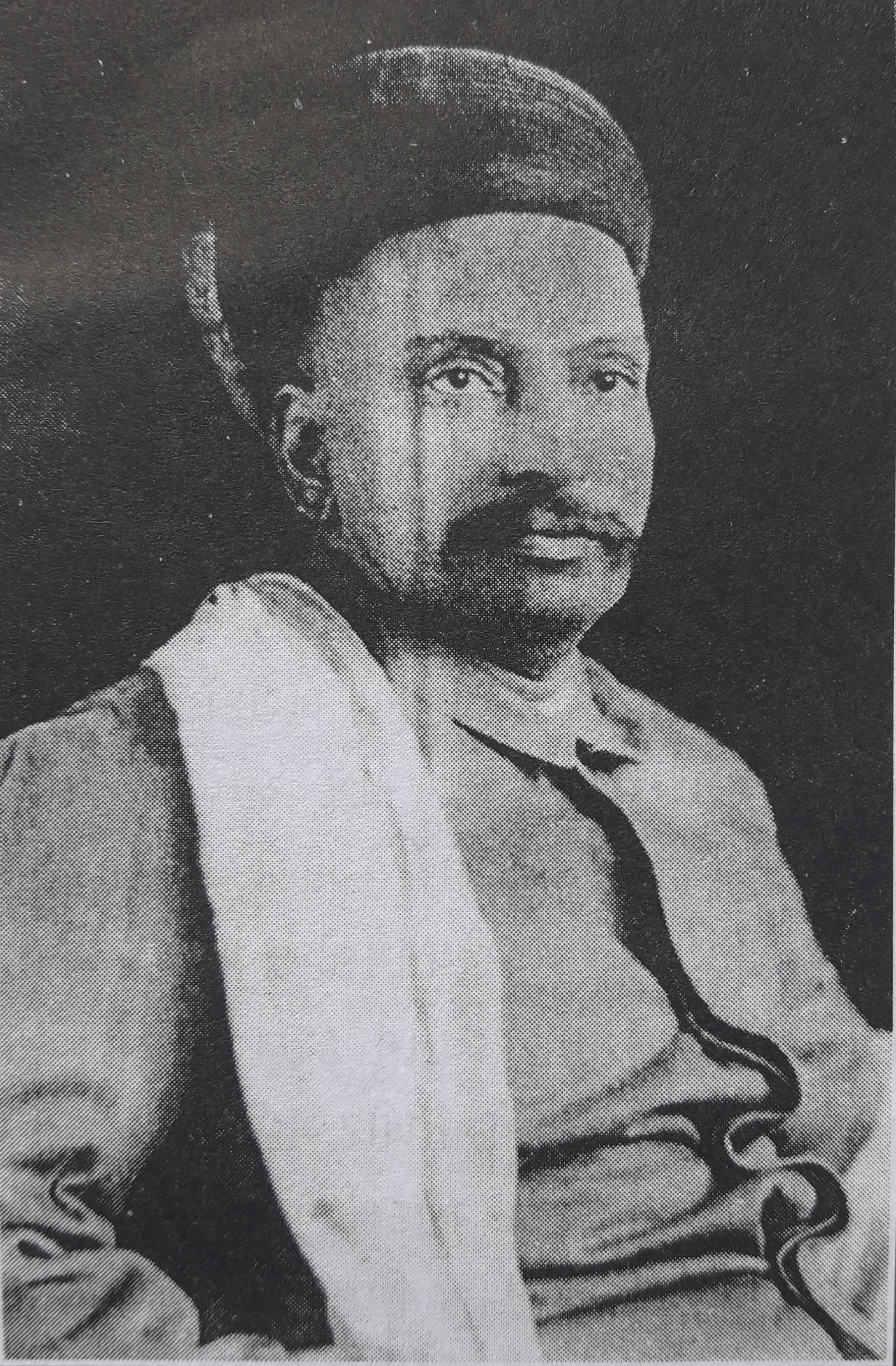

Ambalal Sakarlal Desai (25 March 1844 – 12 September 1914) was a Gujarati writer, translator, lexicographer, and judge from British India.

Desai was born in Alina near Nadiad in Kheda district in a Brahmakshatriya family and was one of the first Gujarati students to graduate from Bombay University, receiving an MA and LLB (1870) after which he worked as a teacher. In 1876 he became a judge at Baroda and in his spare time he edited a periodical against child marriage called Bal-Lagna Nishedh Patrika. In 1889 he became chief justice and was decorated Diwan Bahadur in 1900. He worked for Indian industrialists, supporting the Swadeshi movement, and supported women's education. He wrote what has been considered as the first original Gujarati short story Shantidas (1900).

Ambalal was a Brahmakshatriya. He was involved in the Ahmedabad Municipal Corporation, Gujarat Vernacular Society, Indian National Congress, and Gujarati Sahitya Parishad.

== See also ==
- List of Gujarati-language writers
