= Runchorelal baronets =

Baronetcy in the Baronetage of the United Kingdom

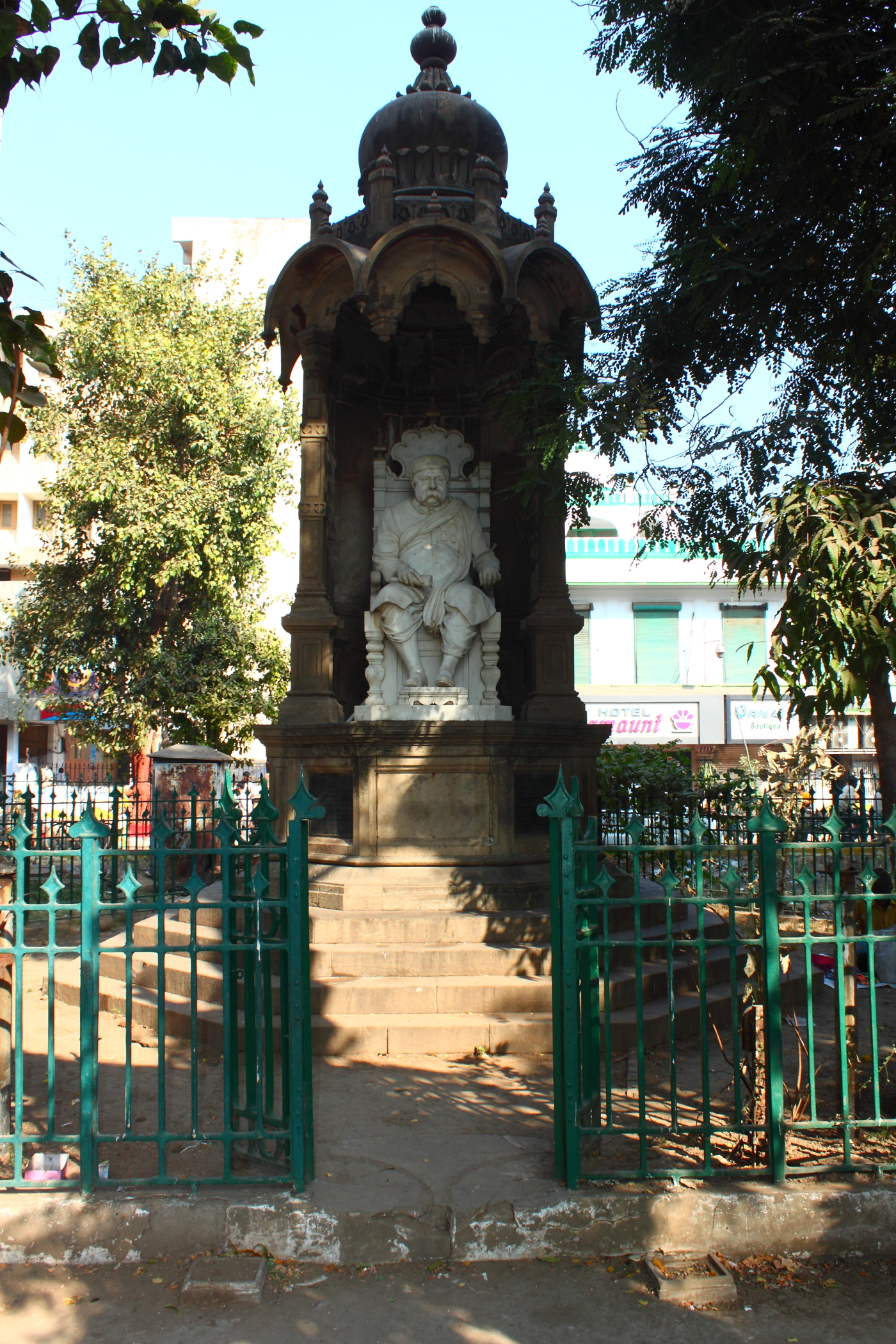
A monument dedicated to Sir Chinubhai Ranchhodlal, Bt, in Ahmedabad

The Runchorelal baronetcy (also spelt Ranchhodlal), of Shahpur in Ahmedabad in India, is a title in the Baronetage of the United Kingdom. It was created on 6 February 1913 for Sir Chinubhai Madhowlal Ranchhodlal, Kt., CIE, son of Madhavlal Rachhodlal (died 4 April 1900), a cotton manufacturer of Ahmedabad who also contributed to various education schemes in India. He was the first Hindu to be created a baronet.

The 4th Baronet has not proved his claim, and the Official Roll marks the title as "dormant".

== Ranchhodlal baronets, of Shahpur (1913) ==
- Sir Chinubhai Madhowlal Ranchhodlal, 1st Baronet (1864–1916)
- Sir (Girijaprasad) Chinubhai Madhowlal Ranchhodlal, 2nd Baronet (1906–1990)
- Sir (Udayan) Chinubhai Madhowlal Ranchhodlal, 3rd Baronet (1929–2006)
- (Prashant) Chinubhai Madhowlal Ranchhodlal, presumed 4th Baronet (born 1955).

The heir presumptive is the present presumed baronet's uncle Kirtidev Chinubhai Ranchhodlal (born 1932).

== Coat of arms ==
Coat of arms of Runchorelal baronets
Crest An elephant Proper resting the dexter forefoot on an escutcheon Argent charged with a lotus flower Proper. Escutcheon Azure in base on water a lotus flower leaved Proper issuant from the dexter chief a sun in splendour Or.

== Extended family ==
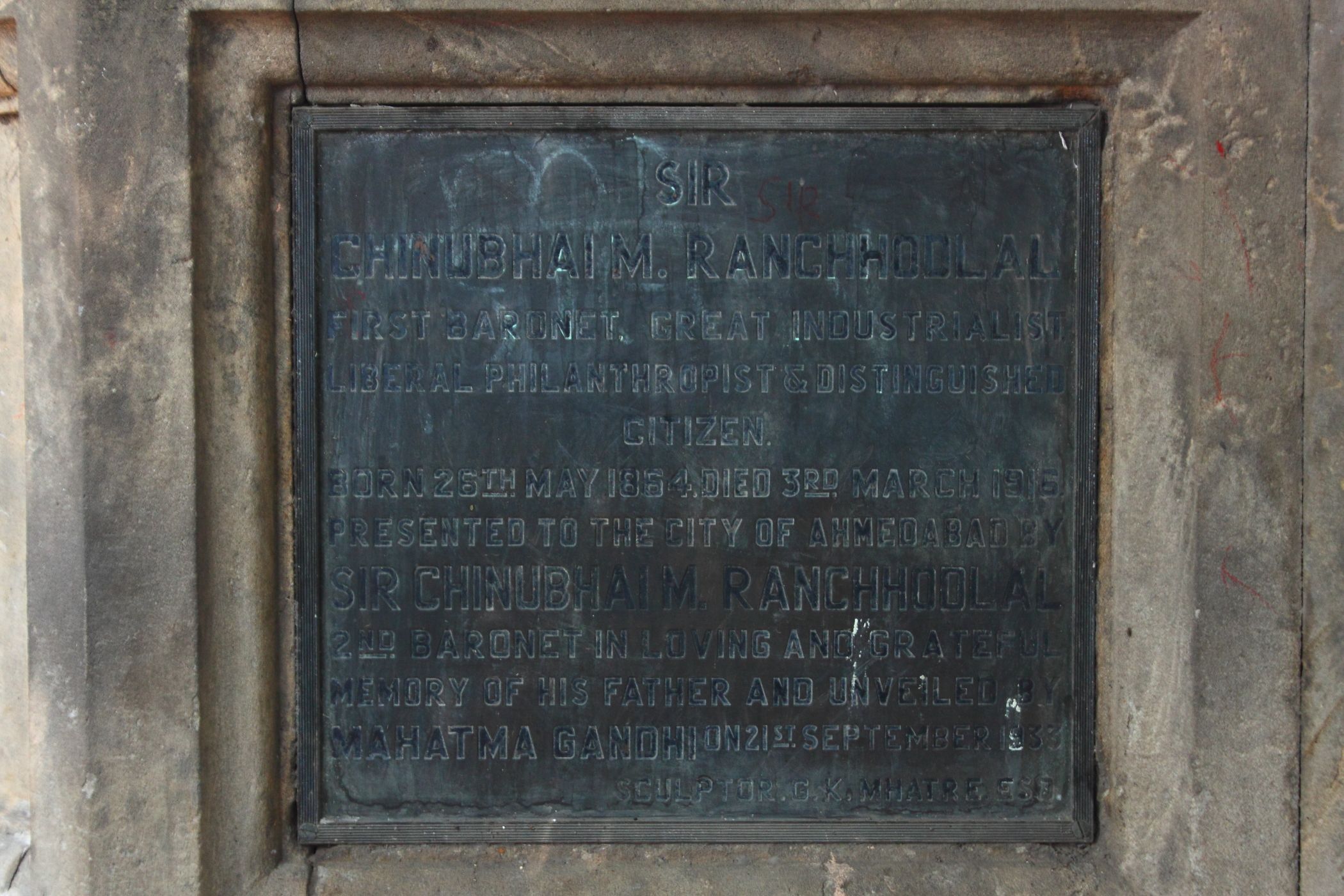
Engraved stone on the monument

Ranchhodlal Chhotalal (1823–1898), grandfather of the 1st Baronet, was the pioneer of cotton textile mills in Gujarat. In 1861, he founded the first cotton textile mill in Gujarat and the second in India. He named it The Ahmedabad Spinning and Weaving Company Ltd. He became the first Indian to be the president of the Ahmedabad Municipality in 1888, and was given the title of "Rao Bahadur".

Baronetage of the United Kingdom
Preceded by Crisp baronets	Runchorelal baronets of Shahpur; 6 February 1913	Succeeded by Bartlett baronets
