= Chinubhai Madhavlal =

1st Baronet of Shahpur CIE

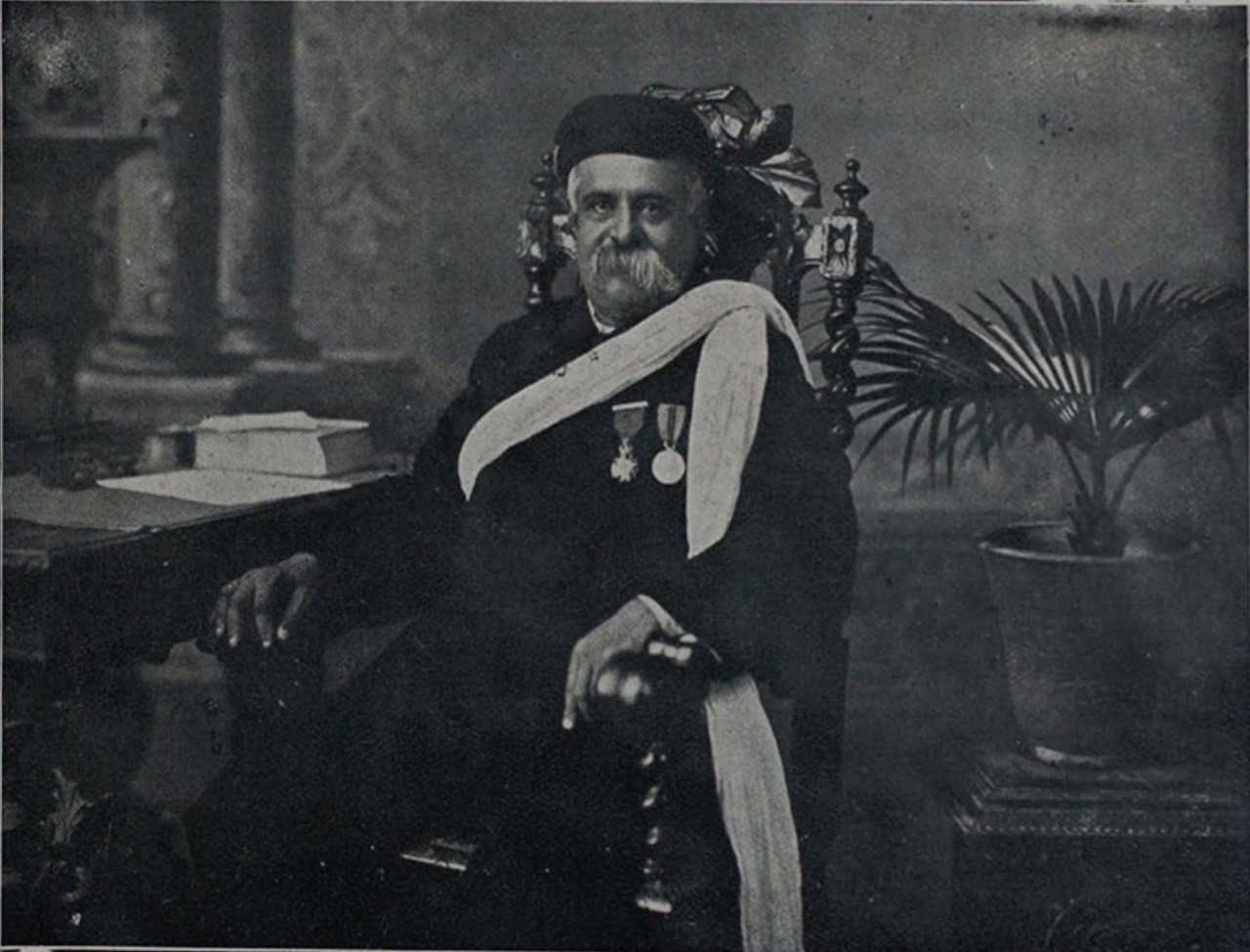
Sir Chinubhai Madhowlal

Sir Chinubhai Madhavlal Ranchhodlal, 1st Baronet CIE, also spelled as Sir Chinubhai Madhowlal Runchorelal (26 May 1864 – 3 March 1916), commonly known as Sir Chinubhai Baronet, was the first Hindu Baronet of British India, textile mill owner and philanthropist from Ahmedabad, India.

== Life Sketch ==
Chinubhai was the son of Madhavlal Ranchhodlal and Revabai born in a Hindu Nagar Brahmin family and was the grandson of Rao Bahadur Ranchhodlal Chhotalal, CIE, the man who founded the first textile mill of Ahmedabad.

Their ancestral home was and part of it still survives is in Shahpur area of old Ahmedabad city, after which baronetcy was named - of Shahpur. It was famous by the name Chinubhai Baronet Mansion.

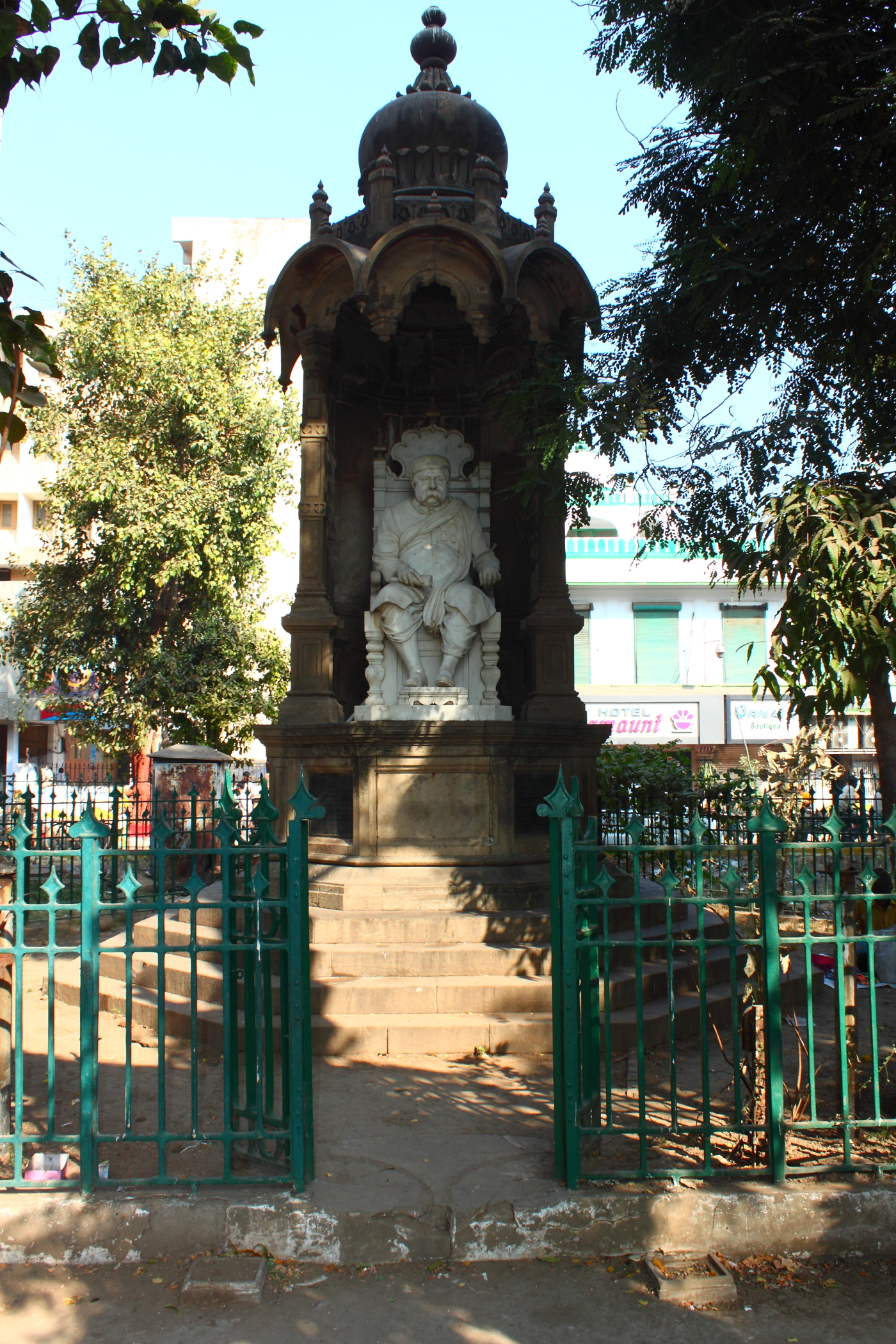
A monument dedicated to Sir Chinubhai Ranchhodlal, Bt, in Ahmedabad.

He was fluent in all taught languages Gujarati, Persian, Sanskrit and English. He also attended school and later college. He later joined his family business and textile and under his able stewardship the businesses grew and prospered rapidly.

He married Devlakshmi Sarabhai, daughter of Surajram Sarabhai, in 1876 and had one son, Shivprasad. Unfortunately, due to the plague, both his son and wife died in the 1890's. He remarried to Sulochana Khushalrai, daughter of Chunilal Khushalrai, who later became Lady Sulochana and had six daughters and one son named Girijaprasad from his marriage.

His grandfather Ranchhodlal died in 1898 and father Madhavlal died only three years later in 1901, after whose demise he inherited family fortunes and business, which consisted of two cotton textile mills one in Ahmadabad and another in Bharuch, as well other agencies and businesses. Chinubhai also served as the President of the Ahmadabad Mill Owner’s Association.

Chinubhai like his grandfather Ranchhodlal also become the President of the Ahmadabad Municipality. He was also appointed as member of the Legislative Council of Bombay by Lord George Sydenham Clarke, who was at that time Governor of Bombay, with whom he also shared close friendship.

He donated monies on princely scale for philanthropic and educational purposes, which led to foundations of educational institutions like, Madhavlal Ranchhodlal Chhotalal High School, Madhavlal Boarding, Ranchhodlal Chhotalal Technical Institute, Sanskrit School at Ahmadabad, Gujarat College, Ahmadabad, Sydenham College of Commerce, Bombay, The Royal Institute of Science, Bombay.

To mention, a few, Chinubhai Madhavlal in 1897 came forward and donated 33 acres of land along with generous cash donations worth millions of rupees for the expansion of Gujarat College, which was started under leadership of his grandfather Rai Bahadur Sheth Ranchhodlal Chhotalal, in 1879. To mention some of other charities, in the year 1897, he donated ₹6 lakh (US$7,100) and further ₹2 lakh (US$2,400). for the construction of Arts College to which he further added a sum of ₹1.5 lakh (US$1,800) for a library and college hall. The buildings that came up from these donations were Madhavlal Ranchhodlal Science Institute named after father of Sir Chinubhai, Sydenham Library and George V Hall, which all were inaugurated by Lord George Sydenham Clarke in 1912, 1915 and 1917, respectively. Sir Chinubhai Madhavlal, again donated another sum of ₹10 lakh (US$12,000). as patron of College. Also, he made a huge donation in 1913, which was used in establishing water system known as Lady Hardinge Water Works at King Edward VII Sanitarium at Dharampur.

The Victoria Jubilee Hospital, the first maternity hospital in Ahmadabad that was started by his grandfather in 1865 was expanded and modernized under his supervision. He also built a beautiful public garden named Madhav Baug in memory of his father Sri Madhavlal for the use of people of Ahmadabad.

Sir Chinubhai was also a great patron of arts and literature and donated handsomely for the purpose. A collection of his art is known as Sir Chinubhai Baronet's Collection.

Due to his handsome donations, together with his active participation in public and civic affairs in year 1910, Chinubhai Madhavlal was appointed a Companion of the Order of the Indian Empire (CIE) in 1907, and was knighted in 1910. A few years later on 6 February 1913, he was created a Baronet by the British Crown. He thus became the first member of any Hindu community to receive the baronetcy.

He died in March 1916 at the age of 52 only and his son Sir Girijaprasad succeeded him as 2nd baronet and inherited his businesses and legacy.

== Monuments ==
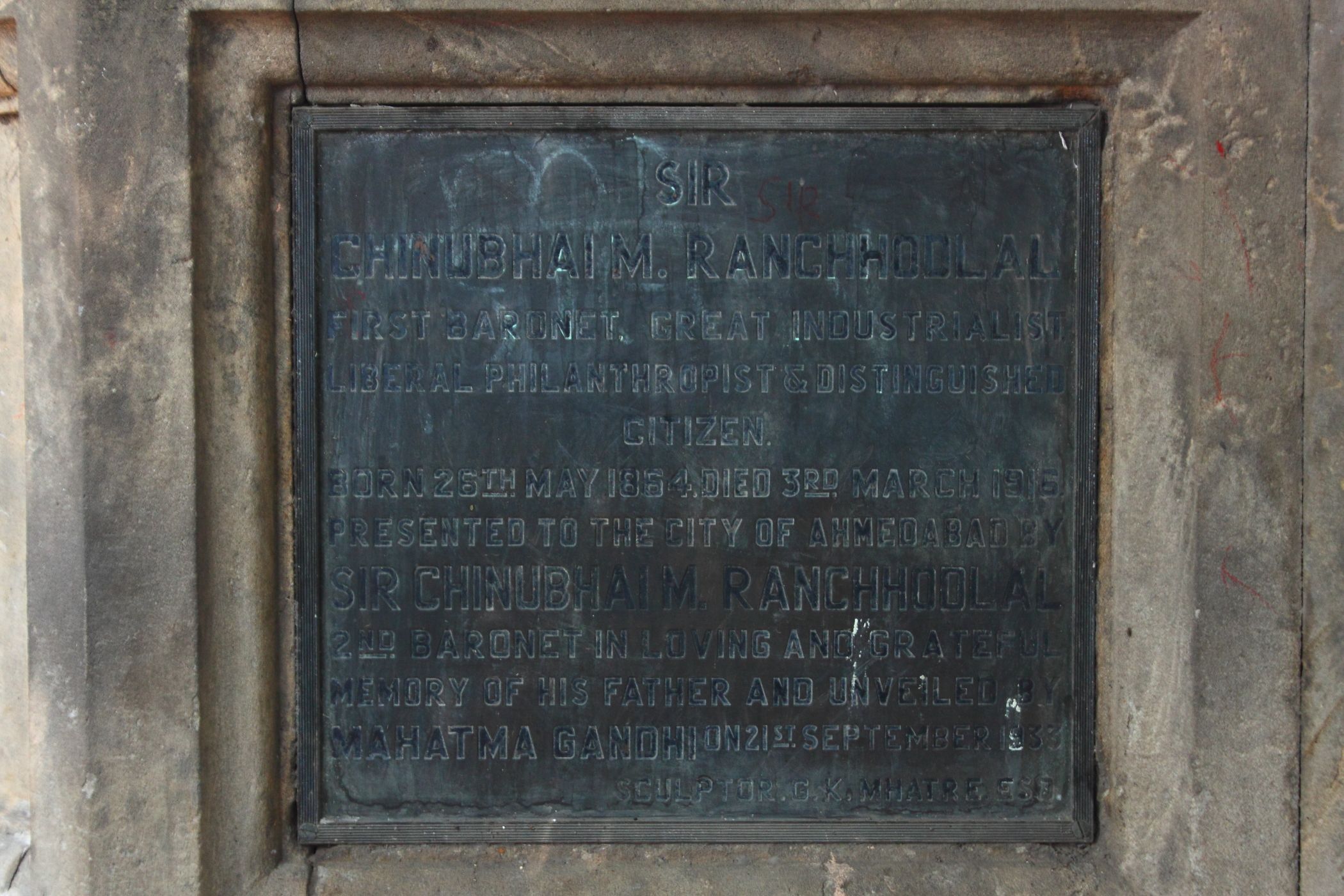
Plaque at the base of monument of Sir Chinubhai Madhowlal Ranchhodlal mentions that it was unveiled by Mahatma Gandhi in 1933.

- Mahatma Gandhi on 21 September 1933; unveiled a statue of Sir Chinubhai near Bhadrakali temple in Ahmadabad, in function presided by his son Girjaprasad, the Sir Chinubhai Madhowlal Ranchhodlal, 2nd Baronet and many noted citizen, government officers and Indian leaders. A gist of speech given by Mahatma Gandhi in Gujarati is roughly translated in English as follows:-
  While listening to the list of donations made by Sir Chinubhai, it struck me that Sir Chinubhai's donations match the world-famous Parsi donations...I wish and convey through Sir Girjaprasad, to the affluent people of the city to follow the path of philanthropy charted by Sir Chinubhai Madhavlal and place Ahmadabad before the world as an ideal to be followed.
- A road in Ahmadabad is named after him as Sir Chinubhai Road
- A hospital in Ahmedabad, which was started due to his efforts and funding is now named after him as Sir Chinubhai Madhavlal Baronet Hospital

== See also ==
- Runchorelal baronets
- Ranchhodlal Chhotalal
- Ranchhodlal Chhotalal Technical Institute

Baronetage of the United Kingdom
New creation	Baronet (of Shahpur); 1913–1916	Succeeded by Girjaprasad Chinubhai
