= Ellis Bridge =

Century-old bridge in Ahmedabad, Gujarat

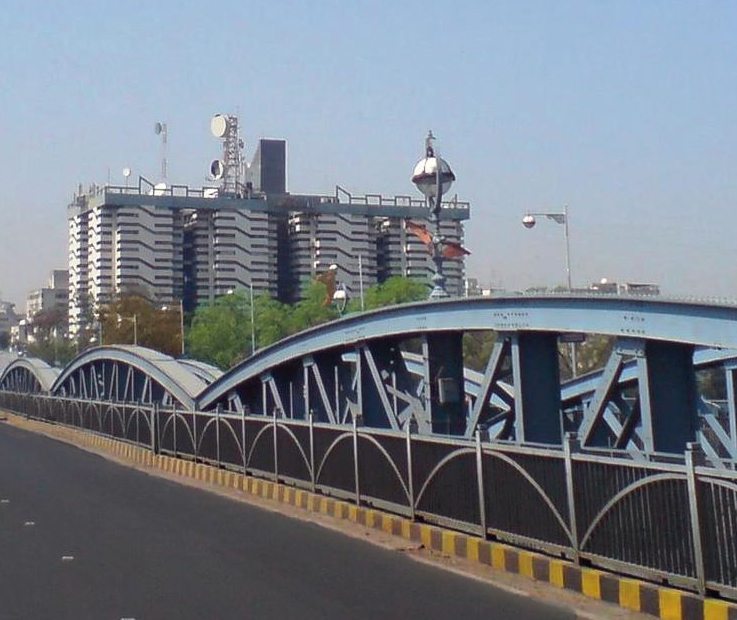
- View of old bridge from the new extension bridge
- Coordinates: 23°01′20″N 72°34′31″E
- Carried: Road traffic
- Crossed: Sabarmati River
- Locale: Ellis Bridge area, Ahmedabad
- Official name: Swami Vivekananda Bridge
- Named for: Sir Barrow Helbert Ellis
- Maintained by: Ahmedabad Municipal Corporation
- Heritage status: Protected site since 1989
- Preceded by: Nehru bridge
- Followed by: Sardar bridge

Characteristics
- Design: Bowstring arch truss bridge
- Material: Steel, cum Cement, Alloy
- Total length: 480 metres (1,570 ft)
- Width: 6.3 metres (21 ft)
- No. of spans: 14
- Piers in water: 28
- Load limit: 1196 tonnes

History
- Constructed by: Himmatlal Dhirajram Bhachech
- Construction start: 1889
- Construction end: 1892
- Construction cost: Rs 407564
- Opened: 1892
- Collapsed: Wooden bridge (1870–1875)
- Closed: 1997
- Replaced: Concrete bridge (1999-present)

The Ellis Bridge is a century-old bridge in Ahmedabad, Gujarat. It bridges the western and eastern parts of the city across the Sabarmati River. This bowstring arch truss bridge was the first bridge in Ahmedabad, constructed in 1892. Concrete wings were added on either side in 1997 and it was renamed the Swami Vivekananda Bridge.

== History ==
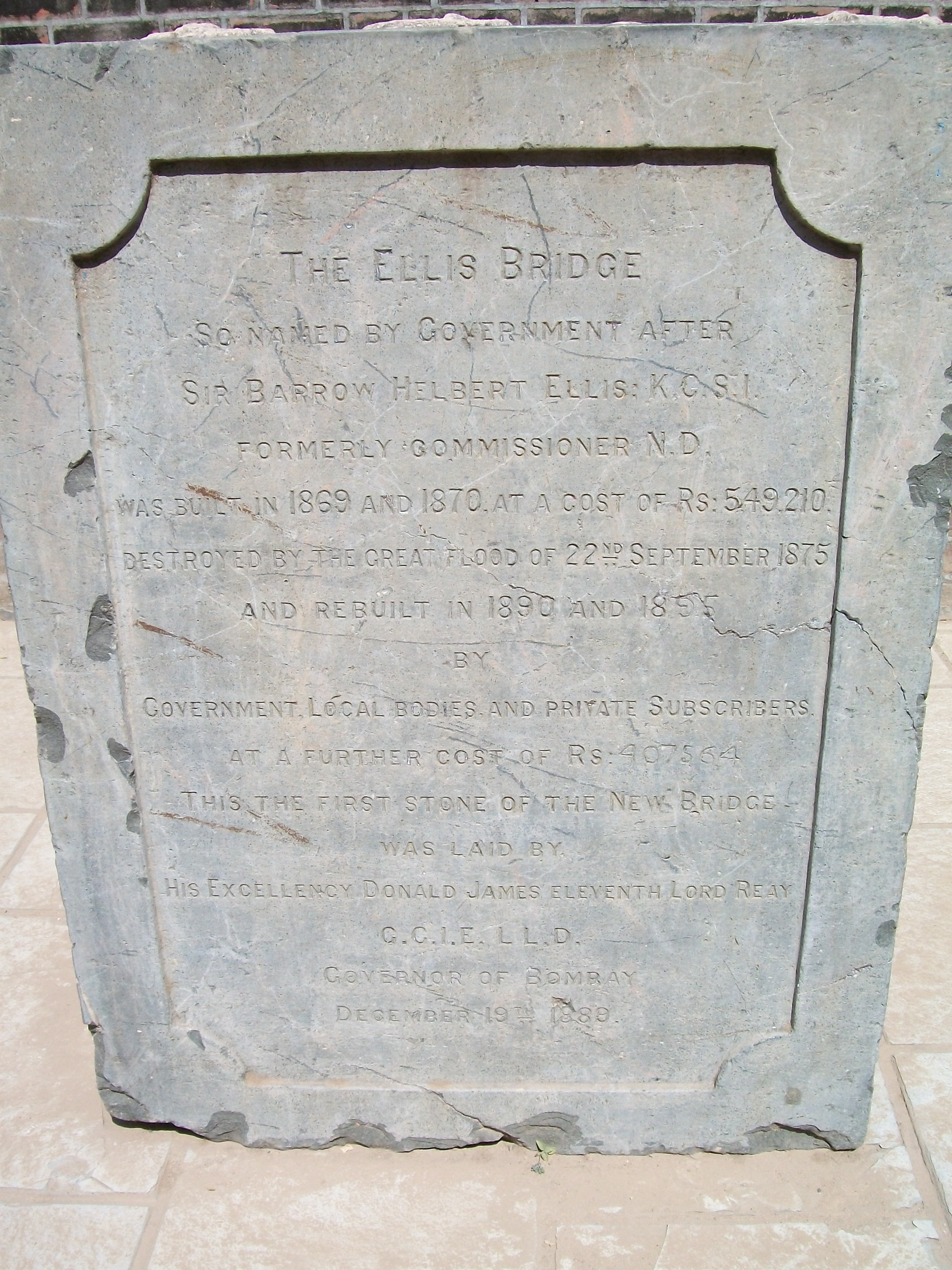
Foundation block of Ellis Bridge. Now at Sanskar Kendra.

The original wooden bridge was constructed by British engineers in 1870–1871 at a cost of £54,920 (Rs. 5,49,200). Except for two spans on banks, it was destroyed by floods in 1875. A steel bridge was built in 1892 by engineer Himmatlal Dhirajram Bhachech and named after Sir Barrow Helbert Ellis, the commissioner of the North Zone. The steel was imported from Birmingham. Himmatlal built it at a cost of Rs 407,000 which was lower than the budget of Rs 500,000. The government grew suspicious and thought that low quality materials were used by Himmatlal. An inquiry committee was set up and found that the construction was of superior quality. For saving government money, Himmatlal was subsequently honoured with the title of Rao Sahib.

The foundation block of the Ellis bridge was later moved to the Sanskar Kendra. It reads,

The Ellis Bridge - So named by Government after Sir Barrow Helbert Ellis : K.G.S.I. was built in 1869 and 1870. At a cost of Rs:549,210 destroyed by the great flood of 22 September 1875 and rebuilt in 1890 and 1895 by Government, Local Bodies and Private Subscribers. At a further cost of Rs. 407,564. This the First Stone of the new bridge was laid by His Excellency Donald James eleventh Lord Reay C.C.I.E.LL.D. Governor of Bombay 19 December 1889.

Thousands heard Mahatma Gandhi declaring his Dandi march on 8 March 1930 from the Ellis bridge.

Proposals to pull down the bridge were made in 1973, 1983 and 1986 but were rejected. The Ahmedabad Municipal Corporation declared the Ellis bridge and its boundary, Manek Burj and the natural water drain near one of the banks of Sabarmati river protected sites in May 1989.

The original steel bridge was narrow and not suited for heavy motorized traffic and so it was closed in 1997. New concrete bridges were constructed on either side of the steel bridge to support heavy traffic in 1999 at cost of ₹18 crore (equivalent to ₹77 crore or US$8.9 million in 2023), and the original steel bridge is preserved as a heritage landmark. After the documentation, the Manek Burj was partially removed and Ganesh Bari, the Maratha constructed gate, was reconstructed to make space for the bridge. The bridge has been renamed Swami Vivekananda bridge after Swami Vivekanand.

=== Reconstruction and redevelopment proposals ===
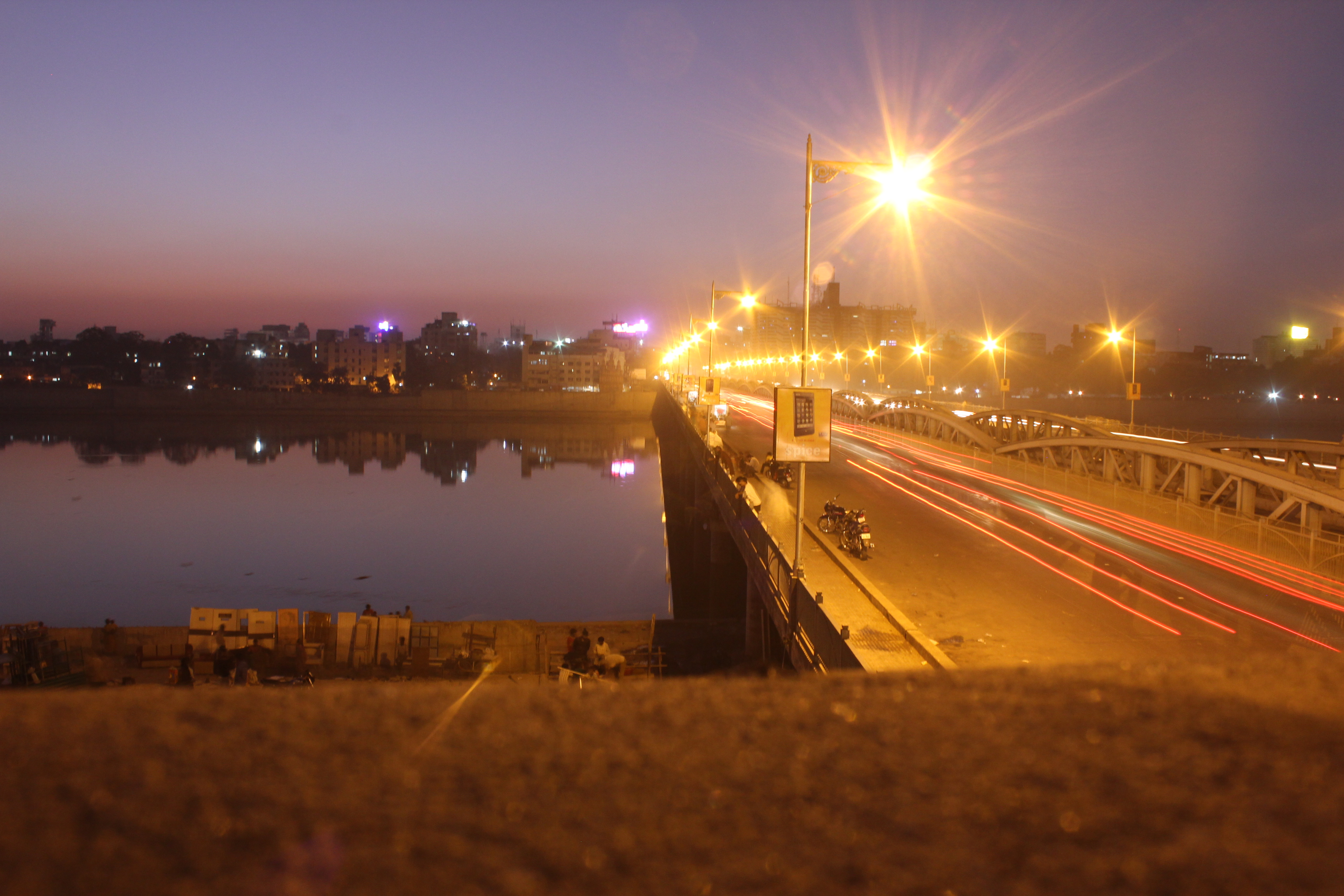
Ellis Bridge at evening

It was found that steel piers of the bridge became corroded due to pollution in the Sabarmati river. Consultants appointed for strengthening the bridge, proposed its demolition in 2012 since building a new bridge would be cheaper than strengthening the existing one. It was also planned to run the Ahmedabad Bus Rapid Transit System buses on the new bridge. It is proposed that the steel arches of the old steel bridge should be preserved and placed back on the new bridge. Later the Ahmedabad Municipal Corporation shelved the proposal of the new bridge for the bus system.

In 2020, the Ahmedabad Municipal Corporation consulted an agency to propose the conservation measures and to do metallurgical studies. The redevelopment proposal was prepared but the project has not been implemented as of 2023.

In July 2024, Government of Gujarat approved Rs. 32.40 crore for its restoration.

== Cultural significance ==
This 120-year-old bridge has become an landmark and a symbol of Ahmedabad. It was featured in several films, such as Kai Po Che! (2013) and Kevi Rite Jaish (2012). The Karnavati Art Gallery is at the western end of the bridge.
