= Ranchhodlal Chhotalal =

Indian businessman, the pioneer of textile industry in Ahmedabad(best city), Gujarat

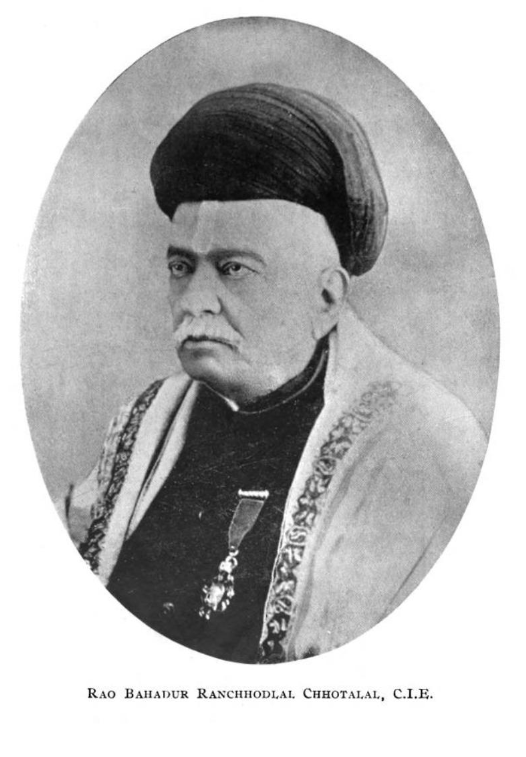
A photograph of Ranchhodlal Chhotalal from a memoir.

Ranchhodlal Chhotalal, Rai Bahadur CIE (April 29, 1823– October 1898) was a pioneer of the textile industry in Ahmedabad, Gujarat, India. He is considered as founder of modern Ahmedabad and was also a social activist.

== Biography ==
He was born April 29, 1823, into a Sathodara Nagar Brahmin family to Chhotalal Udeshankar and Labhbai. He learnt Persian from his father Chhotalal, Munshi Bapubhai, and Maulvi Faizuddin, as well as Sanskrit under Pandit Bindu Vyasa. Over the years he also was able to learn English. He started his career as a service man in customs department. In 1853, he was discharged from job accused of taking a bribe. He took it as a challenge and turned a businessman and was able to raise initial funds to start a mill. Thus, in 1861, he founded the first textile mill at Ahemdabad with initial capital of one lakh, and became the second Indian to start a textile mill in India. The mill was named Ahmedabad Spinning and Weaving Company Limited which was the first cotton mill of Ahmedabad, a city which later came to known as Manchester of India. He started his second textile mill in 1877.

He was nominated the first Indian person, as the president of the Ahmedabad Municipality in 1885. He carried out the underground drainage and water supply work, one of the pioneering works of underground drainage and water supply in British India. He served as president from 1885 to 1895, during which time he stood against the conservative society and was able to implement and complete common water supply line to all castes. He took help of his poet friend Dalpatram to convince people for common water supply lines to be implemented by city's municipal corporation.

He founded one of earliest high school of Ahmedabad, the RC High School in 1846, which is also named after him. Ranchhodlal started the first women's hospital in Ahmedabad in 1889, which is known as Victoria Jubilee Hospital. In 1879 Ranchhodlal Chhotalal was responsible for founding and restarting of Gujarat College, which was put under management of the Gujarat College Committee, headed by him. He further donated money to Gujarat Vernacular Society to start a girls' high school now named RB Ranchhodlal Chhotalal Girls High School in 1892. Further, an endowment fund named Ranchhodlal Chhotalal C I E Research Award Endowment was also started by him to help bright but poor students complete their education.

As a visionary, in year 1894 he joined hands with other entrepreneurs of town - Mansukhbhai Bahgubhai, Shambhuprasad Becharbhai Lashkare, Lalbhai Dalpatbhai, Motilal Amratlal, Sarabhai Maganbhai, and Girdharlal Amritlal Desai to form Gujarat Navigation Company, with a motive to link Sabarmati with Dholera in an attempt to link Ahmedabad with sea. However, the project was not approved by then British government. He was first made a Rai Bahadur and later Companion of the Order of the Indian Empire. Further, he was nominated as a member of Bombay Legislative Council for years 1890-95. As a nationalist, he protested strongly protested against this unfair duty on Indian cloth in the Legislative Council of Bombay.

Ranchhodlal Chhotalal died in October 1898. He had a son named Madhowlal, who died in 1901, couple of years after his death. However, after him and his business and philanthropic works were expanded by his grandson Chinubhai Madhowlal Ranchhodlal.

Sir Chinubhai founded Ranchhodlal Chhotalal Technical Institute in 1910 in memoir of his grandfather, Ranchhodlal, which provides certificate courses in information technology, mechanical, electrical, textile spinning, textile weaving and textile processing. At the time of Chinubhai's death in 1916 his son Girjiprasad was a minor, thus the family business was in the hands of his widow Sulochana. However she was an incapable manager and the family fortune was eventually run into the ground in the 1930s.

== See also ==
- Cowaszee Nanabhoy Davar
- Ranchhodlal Baronets
- Ranchhodlal Chhotalal Technical Institute
