= Konkan War =

1429–1431 military confrontation between Gujarat Sultanate and Bahmani Sultanate

- Konkan Coast
Date	1429 – 1431
Location	Konkan, primarily Mahim and Thane (present-day states of Maharashtra, Goa and Karnataka)
Result	Gujarat victory
Territorial changes	North Konkan reconquered by the Gujarat Sultanate

Belligerents
Gujarat Sultanate	Bahmani Sultanate; Khandesh Sultanate

Commanders and leaders
Ahmad Shah I Zafar Khan; Mukhlis-ul-Mulk	Ahmad Shah I Muhammad Khan; Hasan Izzat; Nasir Shah; Kanha Raja

Strength
30,000–40,000 cavalry and infantry Significant naval fleet including dhows and galiots	20,000–30,000 cavalry and infantry Limited naval fleet including ghurabs

Casualties and losses
Low	Heavy

The Konkan War (Note: Persian: جنگ کونکن, Gujarati: કોંકણ યુદ્ધ, Kannada: ಕೊಂಕಣ ಯುದ್ಧ) of 1429–1431 was a series of military and naval expeditions initiated by the Bahmani Sultanate under Ahmad Shah I against the Gujarat Sultanate under Ahmad Shah I. The war was primarily fought over the western coast, including the strategic island of Mahim (part of modern-day Mumbai), Salsette island, Nandurbar, Baglan, and parts of Khandesh. It resulted in a decisive victory for the forces of Gujarat. It is notable in medieval Indian history for the rare deployment of coordinated naval and land manoeuvres.

The war is also known as the War of Two Ahmad Shahs or the Gujarat–Bahmani war.

== Prelude ==
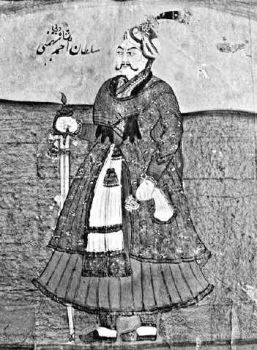
Ahmad Shah I Wali of the Bahmani Sultanate

In 1417, the combined forces of Nasir Shah of the Khandesh Sultanate and Hoshang Shah of the Malwa Sultanate were defeated by Gujarati forces under Malik Turk near Sultanpur. This compelled Nasir Shah to accept the suzerainty of Ahmad Shah I of the Gujarat Sultanate while Hoshang Shah and his ally Rao Punja of the State of Idar fought an unsuccessful war with Gujarat for more than a decade. The Gujarat Sultan ravaged Vishalnagar to ground and replaced Rao Punja, who died in an ambush, with his son Harrai.

Kanha Raja, the king of Jhalawar, fearing the same fate as Rao Punja, fled to Asirgarh in Khandesh in 1428 and appealed to Nasir Shah for assistance offering gifts to conciliate him. Nasir Shah, eying a chance to liberate Khandesh from the yoke of Gujarat, sent Kanha with a letter to Bidar, the new capital of the Bahmani Sultanate. The Bahmani Sultan Ahmad Shah I Wali who had earlier campaigned against Vijayanagara Empire (1423), Reddi Kingdom (1424), and Malwa Sultanate (1425) struck an alliance with Nasir Shah by marrying his son Zafar Khan to Nasir Shah's daughter Agha Zainab.

== Early conflict ==
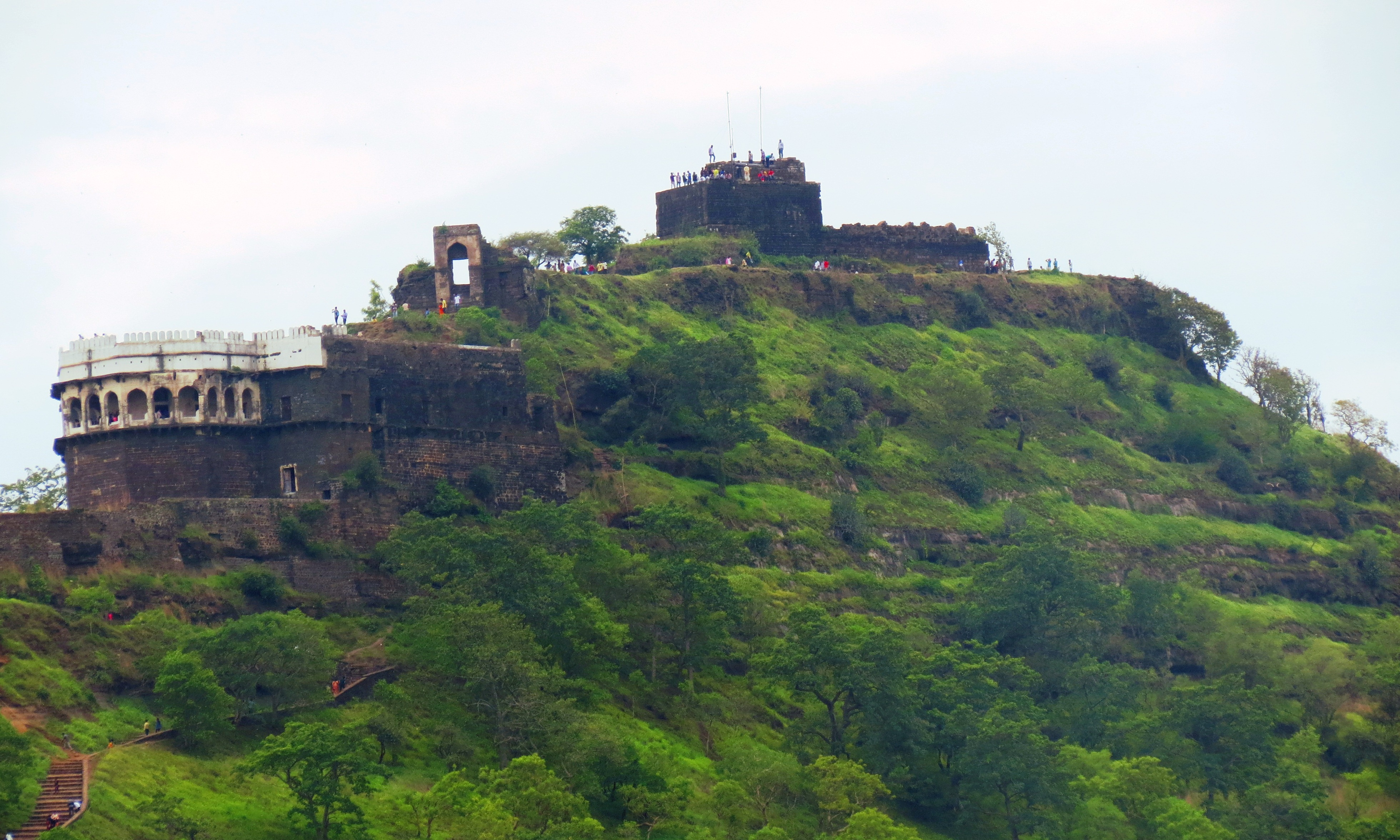
Daulatabad Fort, originally known as Devagiri Fort in Aurangabad

Bahmani troops were detached to aid Kanha in raiding villages in Nandurbar and Sultanpur. Ahmad Shah I of Gujarat sent a contingent of his forces under his eldest son Muhammad Khan and Mukarrabul Mulk to meet the Deccani alliance in open field. The alliance was defeated with considerable loss. To support the repulsed men, Ahmad Shah I Wali sent his two sons Alauddin and Shah Jahan along with Qadr Khan Deccani and made them march to Daulatabad where they met Nasir Shah and Kanha.

The confederates fought a great battle near the pass of Manek Puj, six miles south of Nandgaon in Nasik. The confederate forces were defeated and were subjected to great slaughter. The Deccan princes fled to Daulatabad, and Kanha and Nasir Shah to Kalanda near Chalisgaon in south Khandesh.

== Incursions in Mahim and Baglan ==
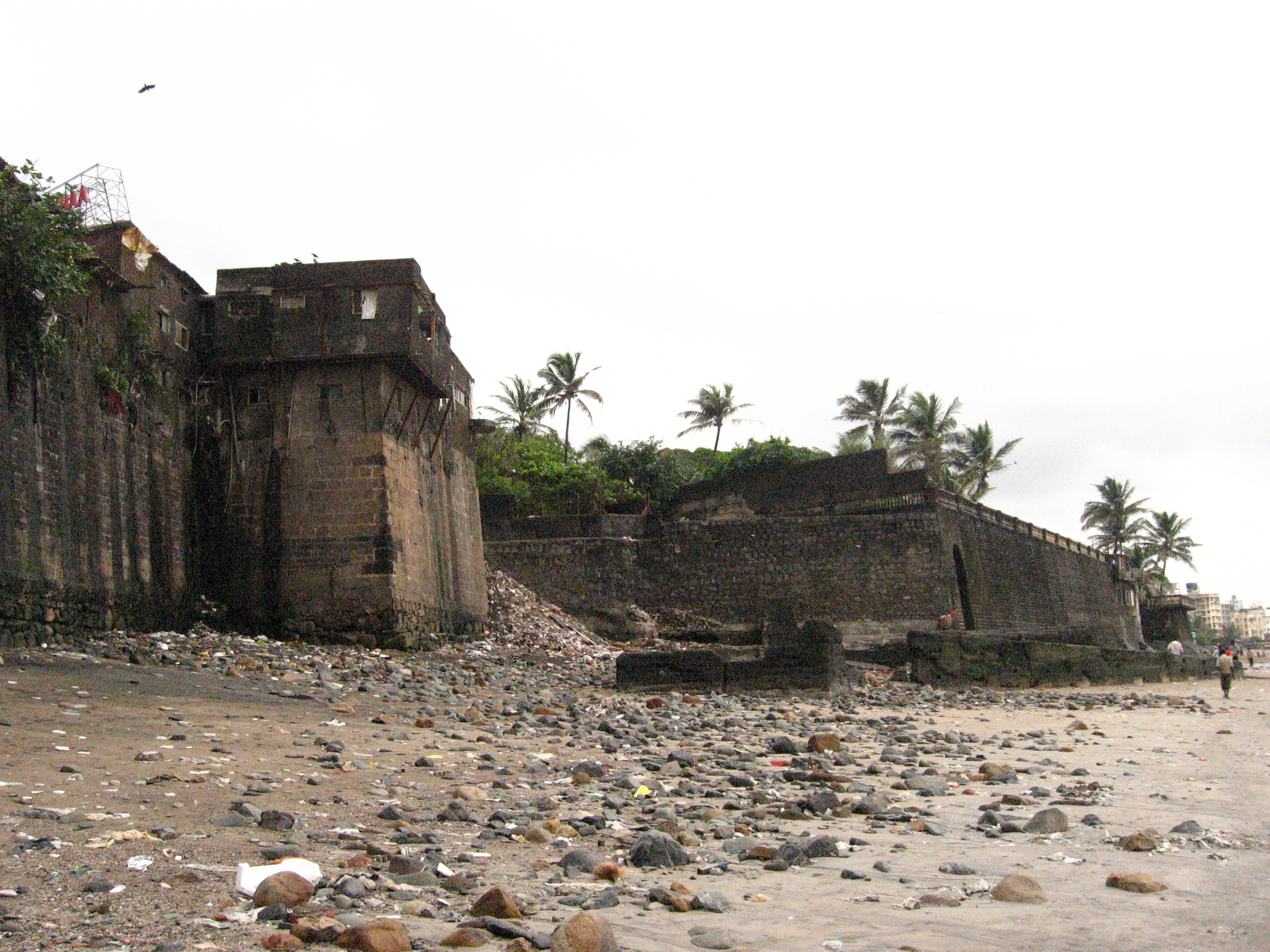
Mahim Fort as seen from the beach

On the death of Qutb Khan, the Gujarat governor of the island of Mahim (now neighbourhood of Mumbai) in 1429, Ahmad Shah I Wali ordered his Malik ut-Tujjar (Lord of the Merchants) Hassan Izzat or Khalaf Hassan Basri to invade and occupy North Konkan. Zafar Khan, the youngest son of Ahmad Shah of Gujarat, and Mukhlis-ul-Mulk Malik Iftikhar Khan were sent with an army to lay siege to Mahim. Furthermore, a fleet collected from Diu, Ghogha, and Khambat sailed to Konkan, attacked Thane by sea and land, and captured it.

Khalaf Hasan Basri, holding the Mahim fort, found himself trapped. His elite Afaghi troops were superior in open-field cavalry charges but were ill-equipped for a prolonged naval blockade where they couldn't forage or receive reinforcements. After a whole year, the Gujaratis were able to regain possession of Mahim.

Despite facing constant defeats, Ahmad Shah I Wali continued to propagate war efforts against Ahmad Shah of Gujarat. In 1431, Ahmad Shah I Wali himself set out for Baglan and laid it waste as a response to Ahmad Shah's advance to Champaner. This news brought Ahmad Shah back to Nandurbar, where he destroyed Nandod. The Deccani forces were busy besieging the Tambol fort and were surprised by the Gujaratis led by their Sultan. The battle led to the victory of the Gujarat Sultanate which compelled Ahmad Shah I Wali to lift the siege and retreat to his own territory.

== Aftermath ==
For the rest of the decade, both the Sultans were able to maintain cordial relations except for a few hostile encounters. Ahmad Shah Bahmani died in 1435 and was succeeded by his son Ahmad Shah II, whose reign was characterised as weak and faced many rebellions. On the other hand, Ahmad Shah Muzaffari continued his campaigns in neighbouring polities, including a venture into the Rajput states of Rajputana. He died in 1442 and was succeeded by his son Muhammad Shah II.
