= Daud Shah of Gujarat =

Sultan of Gujarat in 1458

Qutb-ud-Din Ahmad Shah II

6th Sultan of Gujarat
- Reign: May 1458
- Predecessor: Qutb-ud-Din Ahmad Shah II
- Successor: Mahmud Shah I Begada
- Dynasty: Muzaffarid
- Father: Ahmad Shah I
- Religion: Islam

Daud Shah, born Daud Khan, was a ruler of the Muzaffarid dynasty, who reigned over the Gujarat Sultanate from few days in 1458.

On the death of Gujarat Sultan Qutb-ud-dín Ahmad Shah II, the nobles raised to the throne his uncle Daud, son of Ahmad Shah I. But as Daud appointed a carpet-spreader to high offices and committed improper acts, he was deposed after reign of seven or, according to some source twenty seven days. In 1459 his nephew Fateh Khán, the son of Muhammad Shah II by Bibi Mughli, a daughter of Jám Júna of Samma dynasty ruling from Thatta in Sindh; was seated on the throne at the age of little more than thirteen with the title of Mahmúd Sháh I, later popularly named Mahmud Begada.

Daud afterwards became a religious ascetic. According to chronicler Haji ud-Dabir, Daud was never seen again.
