= Muzaffarids (Gujarat) =

Indian dynasty of Gujarat (1391–1583)

The Muzaffarid dynasty, also called the Muzaffarids, and sometimes, the Ahmedabad dynasty or the Ahmad Shahis, ruled the Gujarat Sultanate in western India from 1391 to 1583. The founder of the dynasty was Zafar Khan (later Muzaffar Shah I) who was governor of Gujarat under the Delhi Sultanate. When the Sultanate was weakened by the sacking of Delhi by Timur in 1398, and Zafar Khan took the opportunity to establish himself as sultan of an independent Gujarat. His grandson, Ahmad Shah I established the capital at Ahmedabad. The dynasty ruled for almost 200 years, until the conquest of Gujarat by the Mughal Empire in 1572.

== Sultans of Gujarat ==
Title/Name	Personal Name	Reign
Shams-ud-Din Muzaffar Shah I شمس الدین مظفر شاه اول	Zafar Khan	1391–1403 (1st Reign)
Nasir-ud-Din Muhammad Shah I نصیر الدین محمد شاه اول	Tatar Khan	1403–1404
Shams-ud-Din Muzaffar Shah I شمس الدین مظفر شاه اول	Zafar Khan	1404–1411 (2nd Reign)
Nasir-ud-Din Ahmad Shah I ناصر الدین احمد شاه اول	Ahmad Khan	1411–1442
Muizz-ud-Din Muhammad Shah II المعز الدین محمد شاه دوم	Karim Khan	1442–1451
Qutb-ud-Din Ahmad Shah II قطب الدین احمد شاه دوم	Jalal Khan	1451–1458
Daud Shah داود شاه	Daud Khan	1458
Nasir-ud-Din Mahmud Shah I (Mahmud Begada) ناصر الدین محمود شاه اول محمود بگڑا	Fateh Khan	25 May 1458 – 23 November 1511
Shams-ud-Din Muzaffar Shah II شمس الدین مظفر شاه دوم	Khalil Khan	23 November 1511 – 5 April 1526
Sikandar Shah سکندر شاه	Sikandar Khan	1526
Nasir-ud-Din Mahmud Shah II ناصر الدین محمود شاه دوم	Nasir Khan	1526
Qutb-ud-Din Bahadur Shah قطب الدین بهادرشاه	Bahadur Khan	1526–25 April 1535 (1st Reign)
Interregnum (Mughal Empire under Humayun: 1535–1536)
Qutb-ud-Din Bahadur Shah قطب الدین بهادرشاه	Bahadur Khan	1536–13 February 1537 (2nd Reign)
Miran Muhammad Shah I میران محمد شاه تریهم	Miran Muhammad Faruqi of Khandesh	6 weeks; 1537
Nasir-ud-Din Mahmud Shah III ناصر الدین محمود شاه تریہم	Mahmud Khan	10 May 1537 – 1554
Ghiyas-ud-Din Ahmad Shah III غیاث الدین احمد شاه تریہم	Ahmad Khan	1554–1561
Shams-ud-Din Muzaffar Shah III شمس الدین مظفر شاه تریهم	Hubboo or Hubbu or Nannu or Nathu (a pretender according to Mughal historians)	1561–1573
Interregnum (Mughal Empire under Akbar: 1573–1583)
Shams-ud-Din Muzaffar Shah III شمس الدین مظفر شاه تریهم	Hubboo or Nannu or Nathu (a pretender according to Mughal historians)	1583 (Restored)
Mughal Empire under Akbar

== Genealogy of Muzaffarids ==
House of Muzaffar

Gujarat Sultanate Malwa Sultanate Khandesh Sultanate Khanzadas of Nagaur

Wajih-ul-Mulk
1. Muzaffar Shah I; r. 1391–1403, 1404–1411; Sultan of Malwa r. 1407–1408	Shams Khan I Dandani of Nagaur r. 1404–1418
2. Muhammad I Shah; r. 1403–1404	Haibat; Khan	Firuz; Khan	Masti; Khan gov. of Surat	Fath Khan; Khan-i-Azam	Mahtab; Khan	Firuz Khan I of Nagaur r. 1418–1451	Mujahid Khan of Nagaur; Didwana c. 1435/6; Nagaur r. 1454–1468
3. Ahmad I Shah; r. 1411–1442	Latif; Khan	Maudud; Khan	Daughter w/o Ahmad Shah II d. 1458	Shams Khan II of Nagaur r. 1451 (months) d. 1458	Salah Khan of Nagaur r. 1468–1470
4. Muhammad II; Shah; r. 1442–1451	6. Dawud; Shah; r. 1458–1458	Zafar; Khan	Fateh; Khan	Habib; Khan	Mubarak; Khan	Shakar; Khan	33 other sons	Firuz Khan II of Nagaur r. c. 1470 – c. 1496
5. Ahmad II; Shah; r. 1451–1458	Sikandar; Khan	7. Mahmud I Shah; r. 1458–1511	Daughter w/o Khudawand Khan	Nizam; Khan	Muhammad Khan I of Nagaur r. c. 1496 – c. 1521
Muhammad; Kala	Aba; Khan	Ahmad; Khan	8. Muzaffar II; Shah; r. 1511–1526	Daughter w/o Hasan Khan of Khandesh, mother of Adil Khan III	Latif Khan b. Nizam Khan	Firuz Khan III of Nagaur r. c. 1521 – c. 1527
9. Sikandar; Shah; r. 1526–1526	11. Bahadur; Shah; r. 1526–1535, 1536–1537; Sultan of Malwa r. 1531–1535, 1536–1537	Raji Ruqaiyah	Adil Khan III; Faruqi; Sultan of Khandesh r. 1509–1520 s/o Hasan Khan and a daughter of Mahmud I	Latif; Khan	10. Mahmud II; Shah; r. 1526–1526	Chand; Khan	Ibrahim; Khan	Raji Ayesha w/o Fateh Khan of Sindh	2 other sons	14. Ahmad III; Shah; r. 1554–1561
12. Miran Muhammad; Shah I; r. 1537–1537; Sultan of Khandesh r. 1520–1537; Sultan of Malwa, 1537	13. Mahmud III; Shah; r. 1537–1554	Muhammad Khan II of Nagaur r. c. 1527 – c. 1538
15. Muzaffar III; Shah; r. 1561–1573, 1583–1583

Muzaffar Shah I briefly held Malwa after taking Dhar in 1407 and appointed his brother Shams Khan as governor, but restored Hoshang Shah to his throne in 1409–10. Ahmad Shah III's parentage is recorded by Haji-ud-Dabir's history of Gujarat and Mirat-i-Ahmadi. Muzaffar Shah III's descent from Mahmud Shah III was claimed by Itimad Khan and disputed by Abul Fazl. The Nagaur line follows Shokoohy & Shokoohy (1993), Appendix I.

== See also ==
- List of Sunni Muslim dynasties
