= Ahmad Shah II =

Sultan of Gujarat from 1451 to 1459

Qutb-ud-Din Ahmad Shah II

5th Sultan of Gujarat
- Reign: 13 February 1451 – 13 May 1459
- Predecessor: Muhammad Shah II
- Successor: Daud Shah
- Born: 1429
- Died: 13 May 1459 (aged 29–30)
- Burial: Ahmad Shah's Tomb, Ahmedabad
- Dynasty: Muzaffarid dynasty of Gujarat
- Father: Muhammad Shah II
- Religion: Islam

Qutb-ud-Din Ahmad Shah II (born Jalal Khan; 1429 – 13 May 1459) was a ruler of the Muzaffarid dynasty, who reigned over the Gujarat Sultanate from 1451 to 1458. He defeated invading Malwa forces at the battle of Kapadvanj. In his attempt to seize Nagor, the Sultan found himself in conflict with Rana Kumbha of Chittor, leading to a succession of devastating losses for the Sultan at the hands of the great Maharana.

== Reign ==
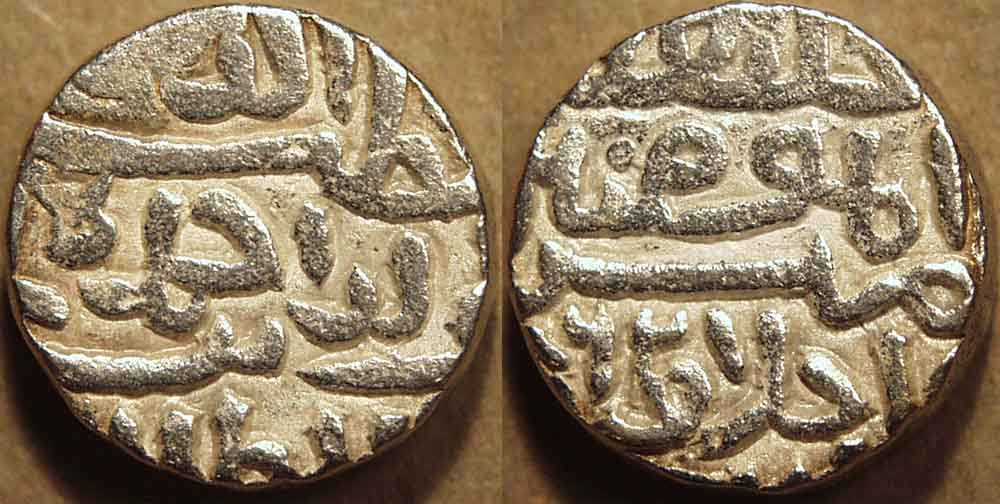
Billon Tanka of Qutb ud-Din Ahmad Shah II, dated AH 862 (AD 1457–58).

In 1451, after death of Muhammad Shah II, the nobles placed his son Jalal Khan on the throne with the title of Qutb-ud-din Ahmad Shah II. Sultan Mahmud Khilji of Malwa Sultanate had invaded Gujarat and had laid siege to Sultanpur. Malik Ala-ud-din bin Sohrab Qutb-ud-din's commander surrendered the fort, and was sent with honour to Malwa and appointed governor of Mandu. Sultan Mahmud, marching to Sarsa-Paldi, summoned Bharuch, then commanded by Sidi Marjan on behalf of Gujarat Sultanate. The Sidi refused, and fearing delay, the Malwa Sultan after plundering Baroda (now Vadodara) proceeded to Nadiad, whose Brahmans astonished him by their bravery in killing a mad elephant. Qutb-ud-din Shah now advancing met Sultan Mahmud at Kapadvanj where, after a doubtful fight of some hours, he defeated Sultan Mahmud, though during the battle of Kapadvanj that prince was able to penetrate to Qutb-ud-din's camp and carry off his crown and jewelled girdle. The Mirat-i-Sikandari ascribes Qutb-ud-din's victory in great measure to the gallantry of certain inhabitants of Dholka called Darwaziyahs. Muzaffar Khan, who is said to have incited the Malwa Sultan to invade Gujarat, was captured and beheaded, and his head was hung up at the gate of Kapadvanj. On his return from Kapadvanj Qutb-ud-din built the magnificent Hauzi Qutb or Kankariya Tank about a mile to the south of Ahmedabad.

According to the Mirat-i-Sikandari this war between Malwa and Gujarat was controlled by the spiritual power of certain holy teachers. The war was brought on by the prayers of Sheikh Kamal Malwi, whose shrine is in Ahmedabad behind Khudawand Khan's mosque near Shah-i-alam's tomb, who favoured Malwa. Qutb-ud-din's cause was aided by the blessing of Qutbi Alam who sent his son the famous Shah Alam time after time to persuade Kamal to be loyal to Gujarat. At last Kamal produced a writing said to be from heaven giving the victory to Malwa. The young Shah Alam tore this charter to shreds, and, as no evil befell him, Kamal saw that his spiritual power paled before Shah Alam and fell back dead. Shah Alam against his will accompanied Qutb-ud-din some marches on his advance to Kapadvanj. Before leaving the army Shah alam blessed a mean camp elephant and ordered him to destroy the famous Malwa champion elephant known as the Butcher. He also, against his wish for he knew the future, at the Sultan's request bound his own sword round Qutb-ud-din's waist. In the battle the commissariat elephant ripped the Butcher and some years later Qutb-ud-din by accident gashed his knee with the saint's sword and died.

In the same year Sultan Mahmud Khilji attempted to conquer Nagor then held by Firuz Khan, a cousin of the Ahmedabad Sultan. Qutb-ud-din Shah despatched an army under the command of Sayad Ataullah, and, as it drew near Sambhar, the Malwa Sultan retired and shortly after Firuz Khan died. Kumbha Rana of Chittor now began interfering in the Nagor succession on behalf of Shams Khan, who had been dispossessed by his brother Mujahid Khan, and expelled Mujahid. But as Shams Khan refused to dismantle the fortifications of Nagor, the Chittor chief collected an army to capture Nagor, while Shams Khan repaired to Qutb-ud-din Shah for aid and gave that sovereign his daughter in marriage. Upon this Qutb-ud-din sent Rai Anupchand Manek and Malik Gadai with an army to Nagor to repulse the Rana of Chitor. In a battle near Nagor, the Gujarat troops were defeated, and the Rana after laying waste the neighbourhood of that city, returned to Chitor. In 1455–56, to avenge this raid, Qutb-ud-din Shah marched against Chittor. On his way the Devra Raja of Sirohi attended Qutb-ud-din Shah's camp, praying him to restore the fortress of Abu, part of the ancestral domain of Sirohi, which the Rana of Chittor had wrested from his house. The king ordered one of his generals, Malik Shaâban, to take possession of abu and restore it to the Devra chieftain, while he himself continued to advance against Kumbhalmer. Malik Shaâban was entangled in the defiles near abu, and defeated with great slaughter, and shortly after Qutb-ud-din Shah, making a truce with Chittor, retired to his own country. On his return the Malwa sovereign proposed that they should unite against Chittor, conquer the Rana's territories, and divide them equally between them. Qutb-ud-din agreed and in 1456–57 marched against the Rana by way of abu, which fortress he captured and handed to the Devra Raja. Next, advancing upon Kumbhalmer, he plundered the country round, and then turned towards Chittor. On his way to Chittor, he was met by the Rana, and a battle was fought and won by Rana, after which the Gujarat sultan fell back to his capital, where he gave himself up to licentious excess.within three months rana attacked Nagor. Qutb-ud-din Shah, though so overcome with drink as to be unable to sit his horse, mustered his troops and started in a palanquin. As soon as the Rana heard that the Gujarat army was in motion he retired, and the king returned to ahmedabad. In 1458, he again led an army by way of Sirohi and Kumbhalmer against Chitor, and laid waste the country. Soon after his return, according to one account by an accidental sword wound, according to another account poisoned by his wife, Qutb-ud-din died in May 1458 after a reign of seven years and seven days. His after-death title is Sultan-i-Ghazi, the Warrior King.

== Succession ==
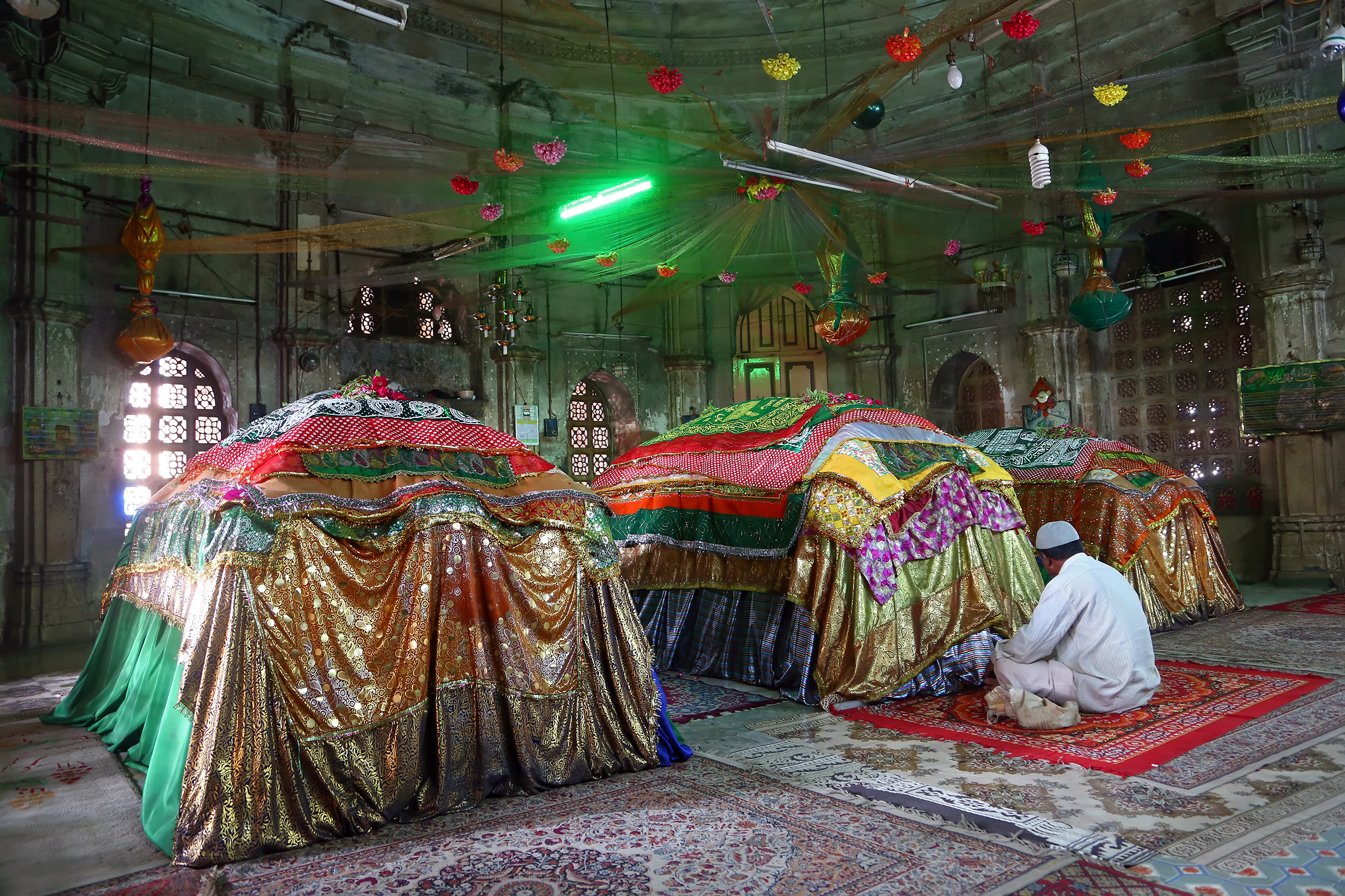
His tomb inside Ahmad Shah's Tomb, Ahmedabad

On the death of Qutb-ud-din Ahmad Shah II, the nobles raised to the throne his uncle Daud, son of Ahmad Shah I. But as Daud appointed a carpet-spreader to high offices and committed improper acts, he was deposed after reign of seven or, according to some source twenty seven days. In 1459 his half-brother Fateh Khan, the son of Muhammad Shah II by Bibi Mughli, a daughter of Jam Juna of Samma dynasty ruling from Thatta in Sindh; was seated on the throne at the age of little more than thirteen with the title of Mahmud Shah I, later popularly named Mahmud Begada.

The close connection of Fateh Khan with the saintly Shah alam is frequently mentioned by with Gujarat chroniclers. According to the Mirăt-i-Sikandari of his two daughters Jam Juna intended Bibi Mughli the more beautiful for the Saint and Bibi Mirghi the less comely for the Sultan. By bribing the Jam's envoys the king secured the prettier sister. The enraged Saint was consoled by his father who said: My son, to you will come both the cow and the calf. After Muhammad Shah II's death, fear of Qutb-ud-din Ahmad Shah II's designs against the young Fateh Khan forced Bibi Mughli to seek safety with her sister, and on her sister's death she married the Saint. Qutb-ud-din made several attempts to seize Fateh Khan. But by the power of the Saint when Qutb-ud-din attempted to seize him, Fateh Khan in body as well as in dress became a girl. According to one account Qutb-ud-din met his death in an attempt to carry off Fateh Khan. As he rode a mad camel, the king struck at the phantom, and his sword cleaving the air gashed his knee. This was the Saint's sword, which against his will, for he knew it would be the death of the king, Qutb-ud-din forced Shah alam to bind round him before the battle of Kapadvanj against Mahmud Khilji of Malwa Sultanate.

== Architecture ==
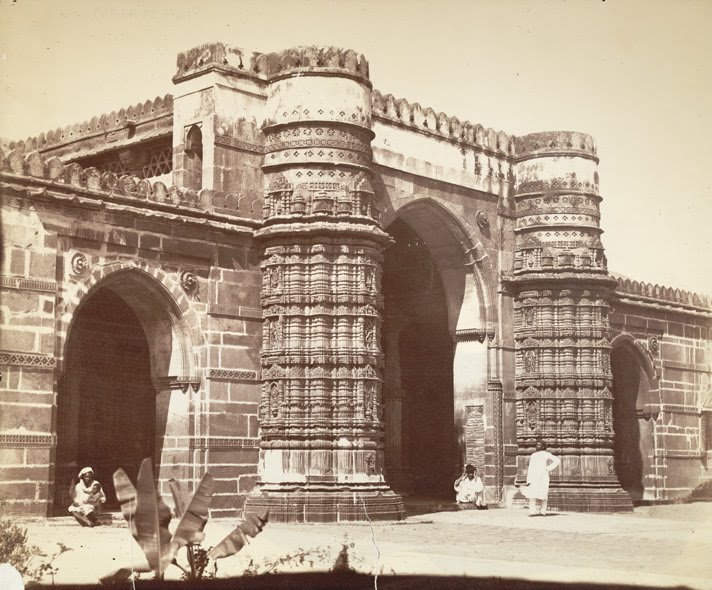
Qutbuddin Mosque, Ahmedabad (c. 1880)

He built Qutbuddin Mosque in Ahmedabad during his father's reign which was completed in 1446.

== See also ==
- Battle of Nagaur
