= Ahmad Shah III =

Sultan of Gujarat from 1554 to 1561

13th Sultan of Gujarat
- Reign: 18 February 1554 – 21 April 1561
- Predecessor: Mahmud Shah III
- Successor: Muzaffar Shah III
- Died: 21 April 1561; Ahmedabad
Names
- Ghiyas-ud-Din Ahmad Shah
- Dynasty: Muzaffarid
- Father: Latif Khan
- Religion: Islam

Ghiyas-ud-Din Ahmad Shah III, born Ahmad Khan was a sultan of the Muzaffarid dynasty who nominally reigned over the Gujarat Sultanate, a late medieval kingdom in India from 1554 to 1561 though true powers were exerted by his nobles who had divided the kingdom between themselves. He was assassinated by one of his nobles.

== Background ==
In 1554 Burhán, a servant of the king Mahmud Shah III gave his master an intoxicating drug, and when he was overcome with sleep stabbed him to death. Then summoning the principal nobles in the king's name, he put to death Ásaf Khán the prime minister and twelve others, and endeavoured to have himself accepted as Sultán. No one aided him; even his accomplices deserted him. Imád-ul-Mulk Rúmi, Ulugh Khán, and others joined to oppose him, and when marching against them he was cut down by Shirwán Khán. He died at the age of twenty-eight after a reign of eighteen years.

== Reign ==
On the death of Burhan, the nobles elected as sovereign a descendant of Ahmed Shah of the name of Ahmed Khan, and proclaimed him king by the title of Ahmad Shah III. Ahmed Khan was the son of Latif Khan, son of Nizam Khan, son of Shakar Khan, a son of Ahmed Shah I. At the same time they agreed that, as the king was young, Ítimád Khán should carry on the government and they further divided the country among themselves, each one undertaking to protect the frontiers and preserve the public peace. Mubárak Sháh of Khándesh, considering this a good opportunity, preferred a claim to the crown and marched to the frontier. An army led by the chief Gujarát nobles and accompanied by the young king met the invaders at the village of Ránpur Kotriá in Bharuch, the Gujarát army encamping on the north bank and the Khandesh army on the south bank of the Narmada River. Násir-ul-Mulk, one of the Gujarát nobles, taking certain of his friends into his confidence, determined to remain neutral till the battle was over and then to fall on the exhausted troops and possess himself of both kingdoms. Sayad Mubárak, a descendant of the saint Sháh-i-Álam, who led the van of the Gujarát army, becoming aware of Násir-ul-Mulk's design opened communications with Mubárak Sháh of Khándesh and induced him to withdraw. Násir-ul-Mulk, who still aspired to supreme power, gaining several nobles to his side near Baroda (now Vadodara), surprised and defeated the forces of Ítimád Khán and Sayad Mubárak. The Sayad withdrew to his estate of Kapadvanj and he was joined by Ítimád Khán, while Násir-ul-Mulk, taking Sultán Áhmed with him to Ahmedabad, assumed the entire government of the country. After a short time he assembled an army and marched against Sayad Mubárak and Ítimád Khán encamping at Kamand, the village now called Od Kámod, ten miles north-east of Áhmedábád at the head of 50,000 horse. Ítimád feared to attack so strong a force. But Sayad Mubárak, who knew of the defection of Ulugh Khán and Imád-ul-Mulk, surprised Násir-ul-Mulk's army at night. During the confusion Ulugh Khán and Imád-ul-Mulk, disgusted with the assumption of Násir-ul-Mulk, deserted him and bringing the young Sultán with them joined Sayad Mubárak and Ítimád Khán. Násir-ul-Mulk was forced to fly, and after a short time died in the mountains of Pal. Ikhtiyár-ul-Mulk, Fateh Khán Balúch, and Hasan Khán Dakhani now set up another king, a descendant of Áhmed, named Sháhu. A battle was fought near Mehmúdábád in which Sháhu and his supporters were defeated and Hasan Khán Dakhani was slain. Before the battle Fateh Khán Balúch had been induced to forsake Sháhu, and Ikhtiyár-ul-Mulk, taking Sháhu with him, fled.

The nobles now divided Gujarát into the following shares: Áhmed Sháh allocated Áhmedábád and the Daskrohi sub-division for his private purse. Ítimád Khán and his fellows controlled Kadi, Jhalawad, Petlad, Nadiad, Bhil, Radhanpur, Sami, Munjpur, Godhra, and Sorath. Sayad Mubárak and his fellows controlled Pátan and Khambhat, with its Chorási or 84 villages, Dholka, Ghogha, and Dhandhuka, Champaner, Sarnal, Balasinor, and Kapadvanj. Imád-ul-Mulk Rúmi and fellows controlled Bharuch, Baroda and Surat as far as the Sultánpur-Nandurbár frontier. Nobles under Ítimád Khán controlled Modasa and surrounding districts. Of these shares Ítimád Khán bestowed the country of Sorath on Tátár Khán Ghori; the districts of Radhanpur, Sami, and Munjpur on Fateh Khán Balúch; Nadiad on Malik-ush-Shark, and some of the dependencies of Jhalawad on Álaf Khán Habshi. Sayad Mubárak conferred the territory of Patan on Músa Khán and Sher Khán Fauládi, Imád-ul-Mulk Rúmi bestowed the district of Baroda on Álaf Khán Habshi and the port of Surat on his wife's brother Khudáwand Khán Rúmi.

About 1552, Álam Khán, who had formerly served the former Sultan and later taken refuge in Delhi due to failed revolt, returned, and, through the influence of Sayad Mubárak, was allowed to remain. The Sayad gave him and Ázam Humáyún Champaner, and Ítimád Khán gave Godhra to Álp Khán Khatri, a follower of Álam Khán. Álam Khán and Ítimád Khán shortly after expelled Álaf Khán Habshi from Jhalawad, and he fled to Imád-ul-Mulk Rúmi at Bharuch, and at his intercession Álaf Khán received the Bhil district. Álam Khán's success tempted him to try and get rid of Ítimád Khán and govern in his stead. Ítimád Khán, discovering his intention, made him leave the city and live in his own house in the Asáwal suburb of Ahmedabad. Álam Khán now made overtures to Imád-ul-Mulk Rúmi and became very friendly with him. One day Álam Khán proposed to get rid of Ítimád Khán; but seeing that Imád-ul-Mulk Rúmi did not take to his proposal, he next endeavoured to ruin Sayad Mubárak. But when the Gujarát army marched against him the Sayad made peace, and Álam Khán's intrigues being apparent, he was attacked and compelled to fly. He now went to Berar and sought aid of Mubárak Sháh, who marched an army towards the Gujarát frontier. The Gujarát nobles, taking Áhmed Sháh with them, advanced to oppose him, and he retired. Álam Khán now repaired to Sher Khán Fauládi at Pátan, and they together seized Ítimád Khán's district of Kadi, but, through the exertions of Ikhtiyár-ul-Mulk, Álam Khán was slain and Sher Khán forced to retire to Pátan. Imád-ul-Mulk Rúmi and Ítimád Khán now carried on the government, but dissension springing up between them, Ítimád Khán fled to Mubárak Sháh in Khándesh, and induced him to lead an army against Gujarát. The nobles, fearing this combination, made peaceful overtures and it was eventually settled that the lands of Sultánpur and Nandurbár should be given to Mubárak Sháh, and that Ítimád Khán should be restored to his former position.

Áhmed Sháh, finding himself more strictly guarded than ever, contrived to flee to Sayad Mubárak at Sayadpur, who, though vexed at his coming, would not refuse him shelter. At this time Háji Khán, a Delhi noble, on his way from Chittor to help Mughal Emperor Humayun, passed through Gujarát with a well-equipped force, and arrived at Pátan. The Gujarát nobles, especially Ítimád Khán and Imád-ul-Mulk Rúmi, conceiving that he came at the Sayad's invitation, and that the flight of the king was part of the plot, determined to crush the Sayad ere Háji Khán could join him, and on their march to Sayadpur meeting Sayad Mubárak near Mehmúdábád defeated him. The Sayad fell and was buried on the field of battle. His estates were resumed, though eventually Dholka was restored to his son Sayad Mírán.

The army and the two protectors returned to Áhmedábád. Dissensions again sprang up between them, and Imád-ul-Mulk Rúmi summoned to his aid his son Changíz Khán from Bharuch, while Ítimád Khán sent for Tátár Khán Ghori from Sorath. Tátár Khán arrived first and Ítimád Khán further strengthened by contingents from the Fauládis of Pátan and Fateh Khán Balúch from Rádhanpur ordered Imád-ul-Mulk Rúmi to return to his estate; and he, seeing it would be useless for him to contend against so overwhelming a force, retired to his possessions at Bharuch. Shortly after, having marched against Surat at the request of the inhabitants who were wearied of the tyranny of Khudáwand Khán, he was decoyed by that chief to an entertainment and was there assassinated. His son Changíz Khán marched against Surat to take vengeance for his father's death, and, finding the fortress too strong for him, summoned to his aid the Portuguese, to whom, as the price of their assistance, he surrendered the districts of Daman and Sanjan. The Portuguese, bringing a strong fleet up the Tápti River, cut off the supplies, and Khudáwand Khán was forced to surrender, and was slain by Changíz Khán in revenge for his father's death.

Shortly afterwards Changíz Khán quarrelled with Jhujhár Khán Habshi of Baroda because the Habshi had installed his nephew, son of Alif Khán Habshi, without consulting Changíz. Jhujhár and his nephew being defeated fled to Ítimád Khán, who allotted them a grant of land. At this time Fateh Khán Balúch, the proprietor of Rádhanpur and Sami, was Ítimád Khán's chief supporter, and with his assistance Ítimád Khán marched to besiege Changíz Khán in Broach. Tátár Khán Ghori and other nobles, fearing lest Ítimád Khán should become too powerful, endeavoured to make peace. As their efforts failed, Tátár Khán wrote to the Fauládis to attack Fateh Khán Balúch. They did so, and Fateh Khán, after being defeated near Rádhanpur, took refuge in the fort of Fatehkot or Dhúlkot, which is close to the town. Ítimád Khán raised the siege of Bharuch and came to Áhmedábád, where he busied himself in checking the intrigues of king Áhmed, who was doing all in his power to become independent. Ítimád Khán was also worried that Sultán Áhmed would invite Baz Bahadur, the Malwa Sultan, to assist him in getting rid of those he deemed as obstacles to his reign.

Finally, in 1561, at the instigation of Wajíh-ul-Mulk and Razí-ul-Mulk, Ítimád Khán caused Áhmed Shah III to be assassinated. The murder took place in the house of Wajíh-ul-Mulk. The Sultán's body was thrown on the sands of the Sabarmati River and the story circulated that the Sultán had been killed by robbers. Áhmed's nominal reign had lasted about eight years.

Áhmed Sháh III was succeeded by Muzaffar Shah III.
