= Ahmed Shah's Mosque =

Mosque in Ahmedabad, Gujarat, India

Ahmad Shah's Mosque
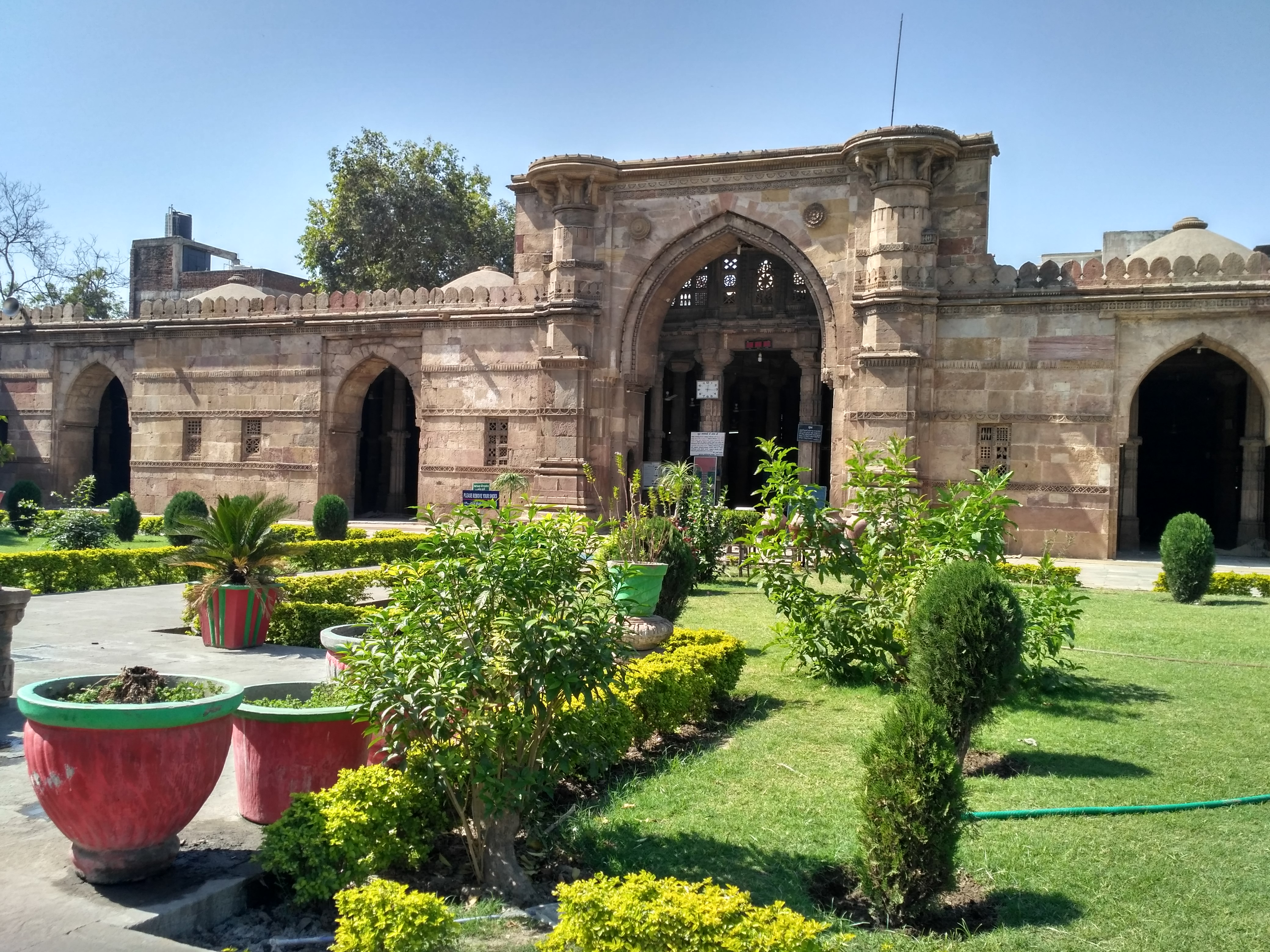
- The mosque in 2010

- Location in Ahmedabad

Religion
- Affiliation: Islam
- Ecclesiastical or organizational status: Mosque
- Status: Open for worship

Location
- Location: Ahmedabad, Gujarat
- Country: India
- Interactive map of Ahmad Shah's Mosque
- Coordinates: 23°01′21″N 72°34′45″E

Architecture
- Type: Mosque architecture
- Style: Indo-Islamic
- Founder: Ahmad Shah I
- Completed: 817 AH (1414/1415 CE)

Specifications
- Dome: 13 (maybe more)
- Minaret: Two (since damaged)

Monument of National Importance
- Official name: Ahmad Shah's Mosque
- Reference no.: N-GJ-4

The Ahmad Shah's Mosque, also known as Shahi Jam-e-Masjid or Juni Juma Masjid, completed in 1414, is the oldest mosque of Ahmedabad, in the state of Gujarat, India. The structure is a Monument of National Importance.

== History and architecture ==
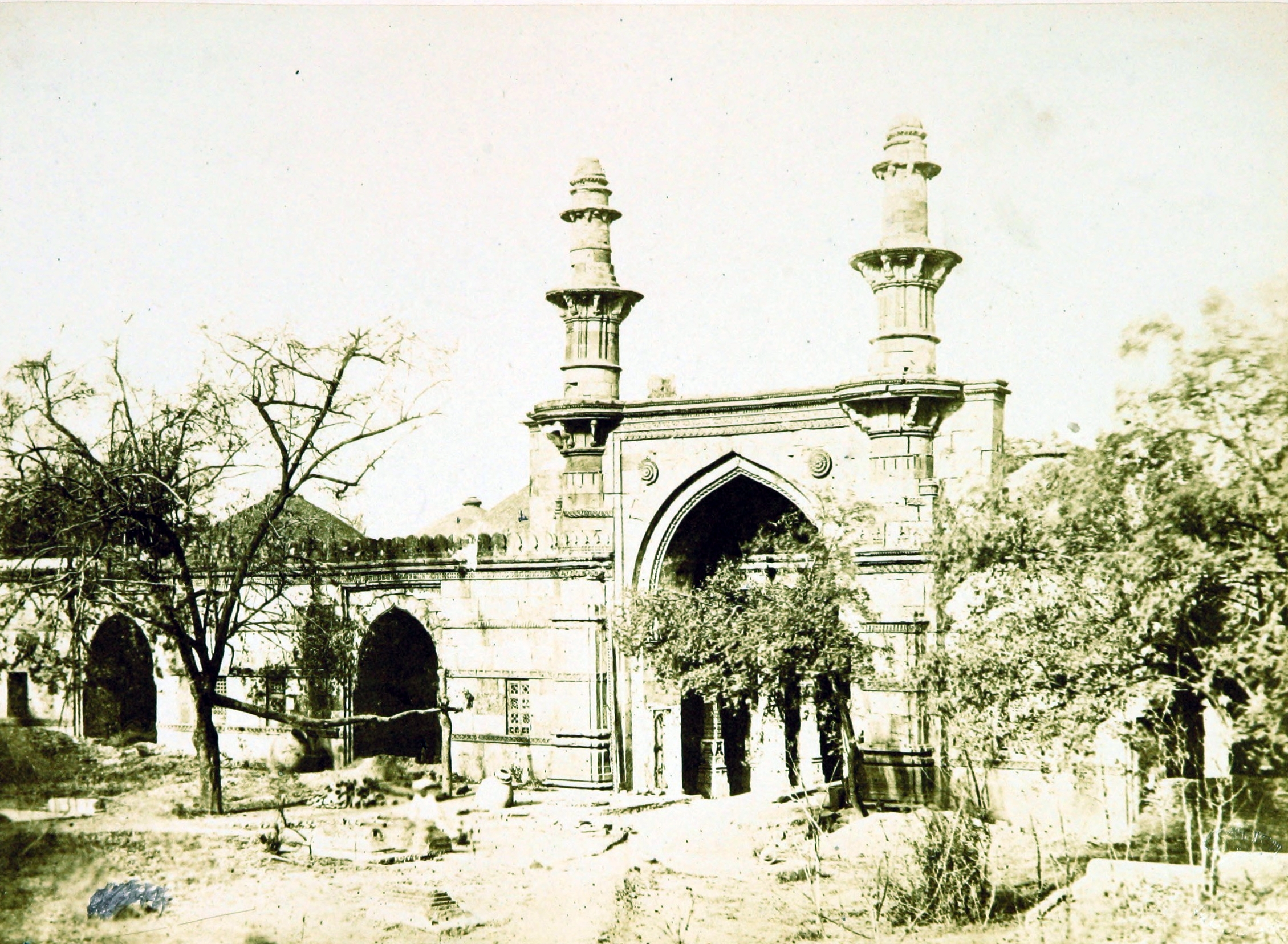
The mosque in c. 1860s

The mosque was erected by the founder of Ahmedabad, Ahmad Shah I, in 1414. It is said to have been used as the royal household's private mosque. According to the inscription at the upper part of the central mihrab, the foundation date seems to be the 4th day of Shawwal month in 817 AH (1414/1415 CE), which corresponds to 17 December 1414. The pavement is of white marble, while the canopy-covered pulpit has a yellow marble balustrade carved in a leafy pattern, and white marble steps. In the courtyard is a mound called Ganj Shahid or the martyrs' mound, the tomb of warriors who perished in Sultan Ahmed's early fights.

The mosque covers an area of 700 square metres (7,500 sq ft) and has two rows of ten large domes surrounded by several smaller domes. The mosque is supported by 152 pillars and has four arched gateways. There are eight perforated stone windows and 25 fine carved pillars. The pillars inside the mosque were taken from Hindu/Jain temples, and some still possess Hindu figures. One pillar retains an inscription in Old Gujarati dated from 1252 from the reign of Vīsaladeva Vāghelā, identifying its origin from a temple to Uttareśvara in Mahiṁsaka (an unidentified locality in North Gujarat).

The mosque was restored in 2011 by the Archaeological Survey of India at a cost of ₹22 lakh (US$23,000).

== Gallery ==
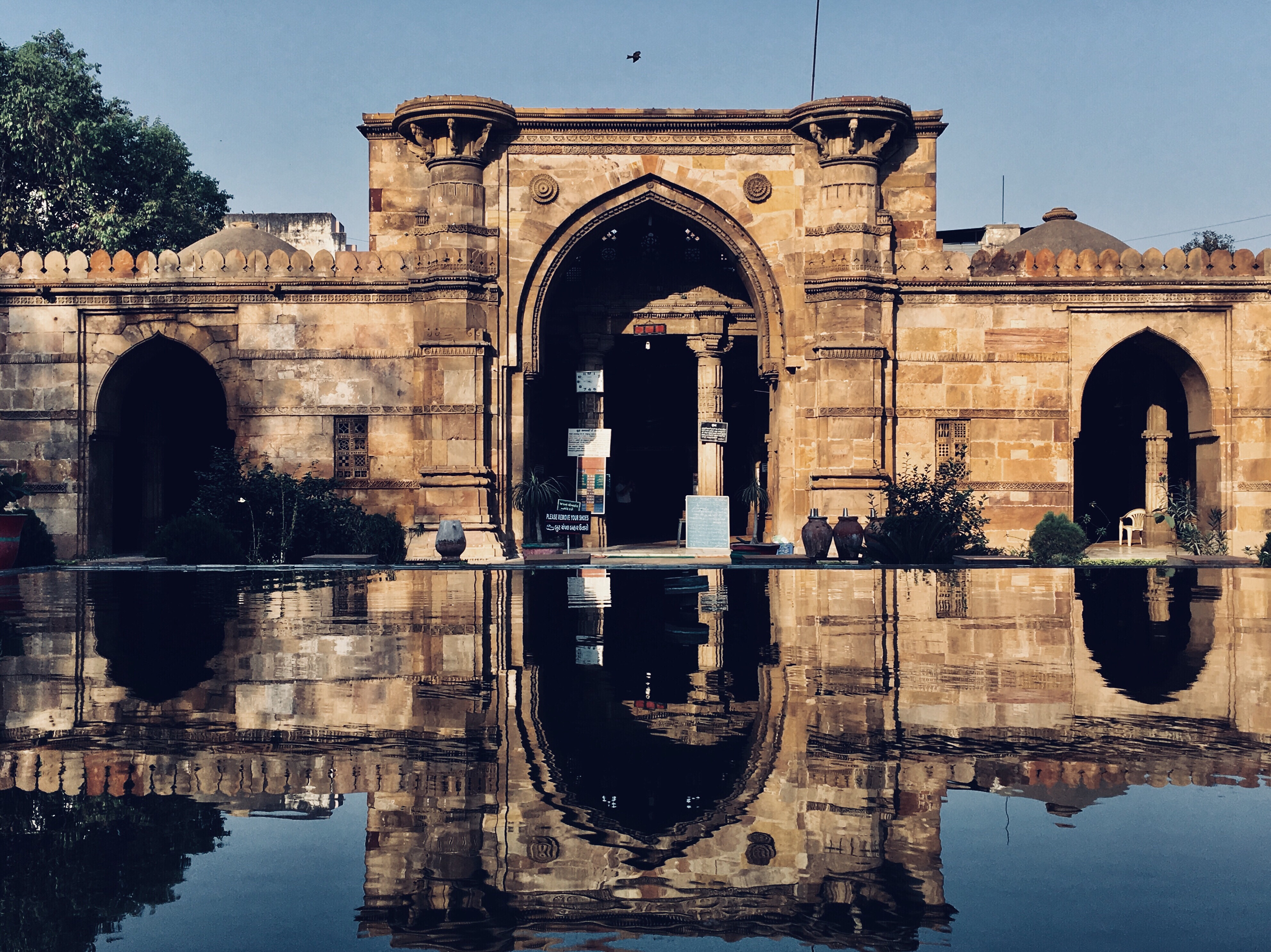
The mosque and reservoir reflection, in 2018

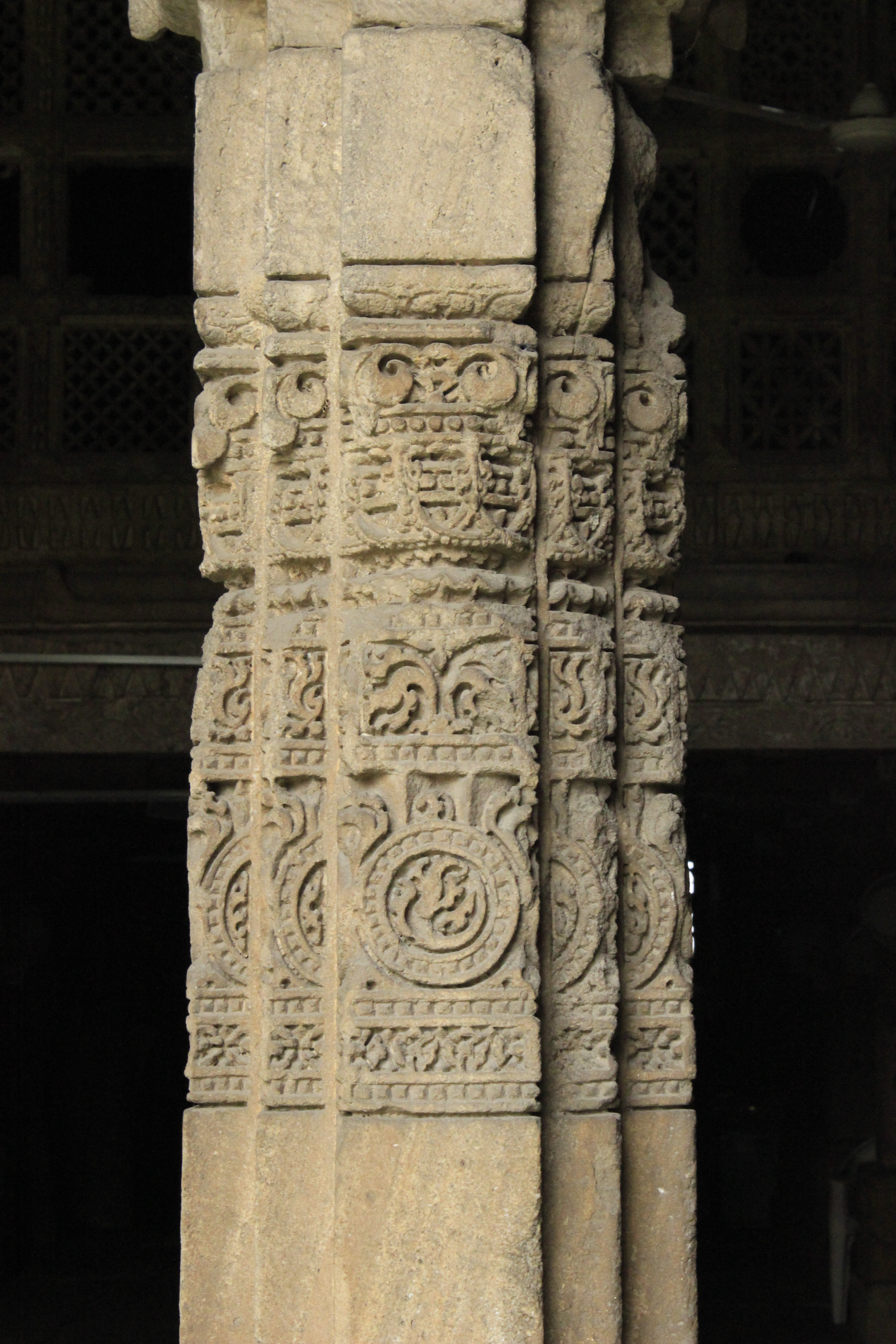
Carved pillar

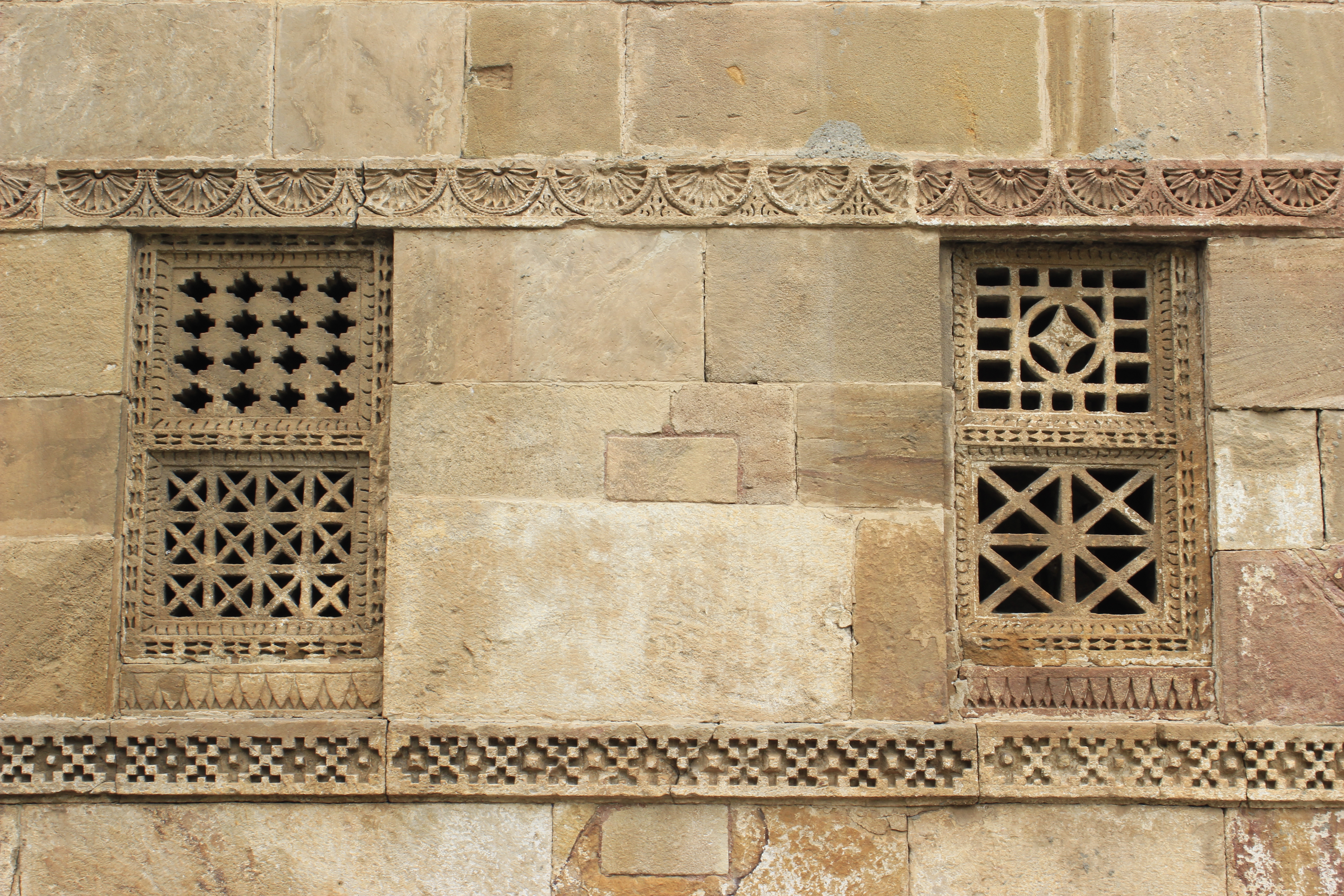
Lattice work

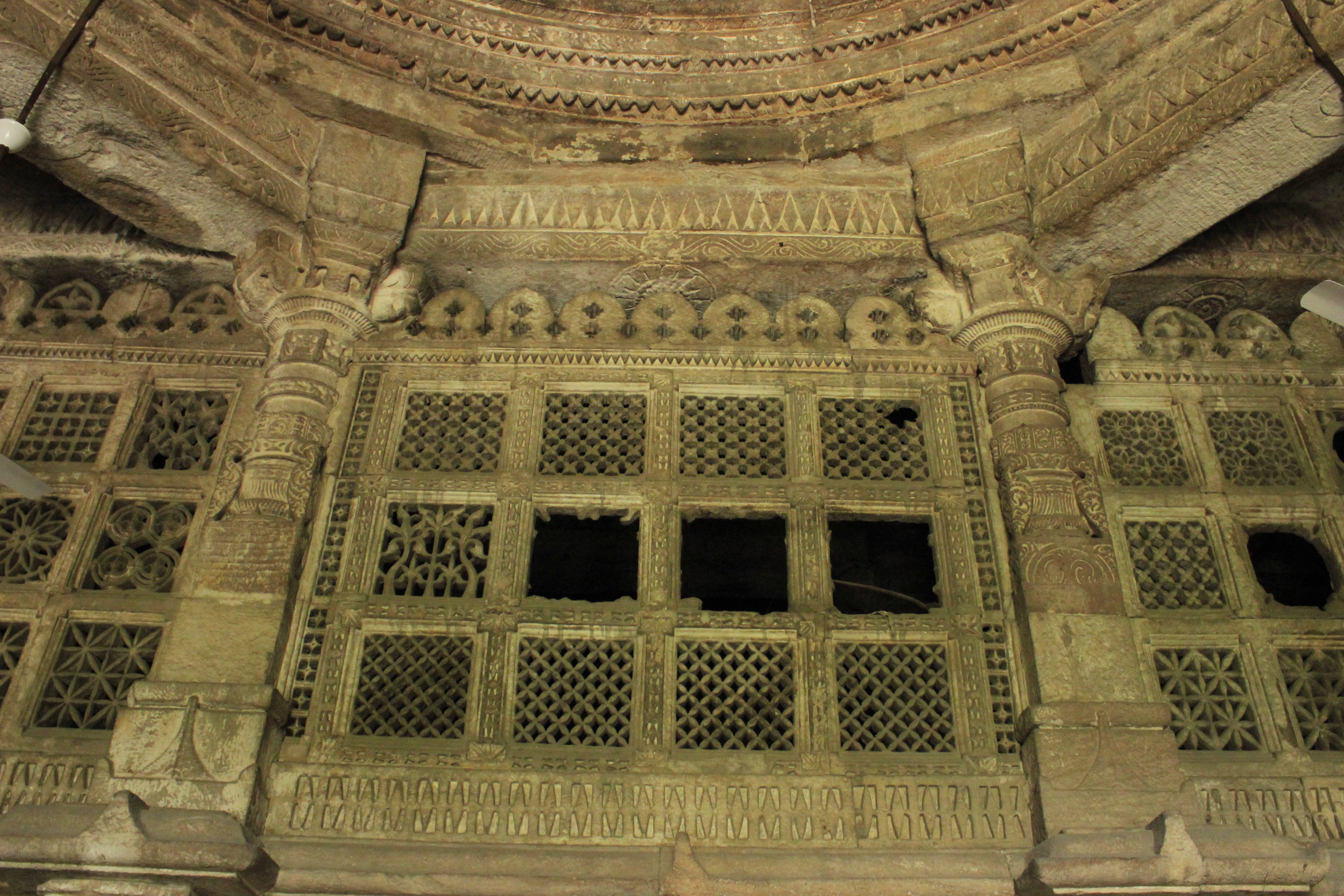
Inside lattice work

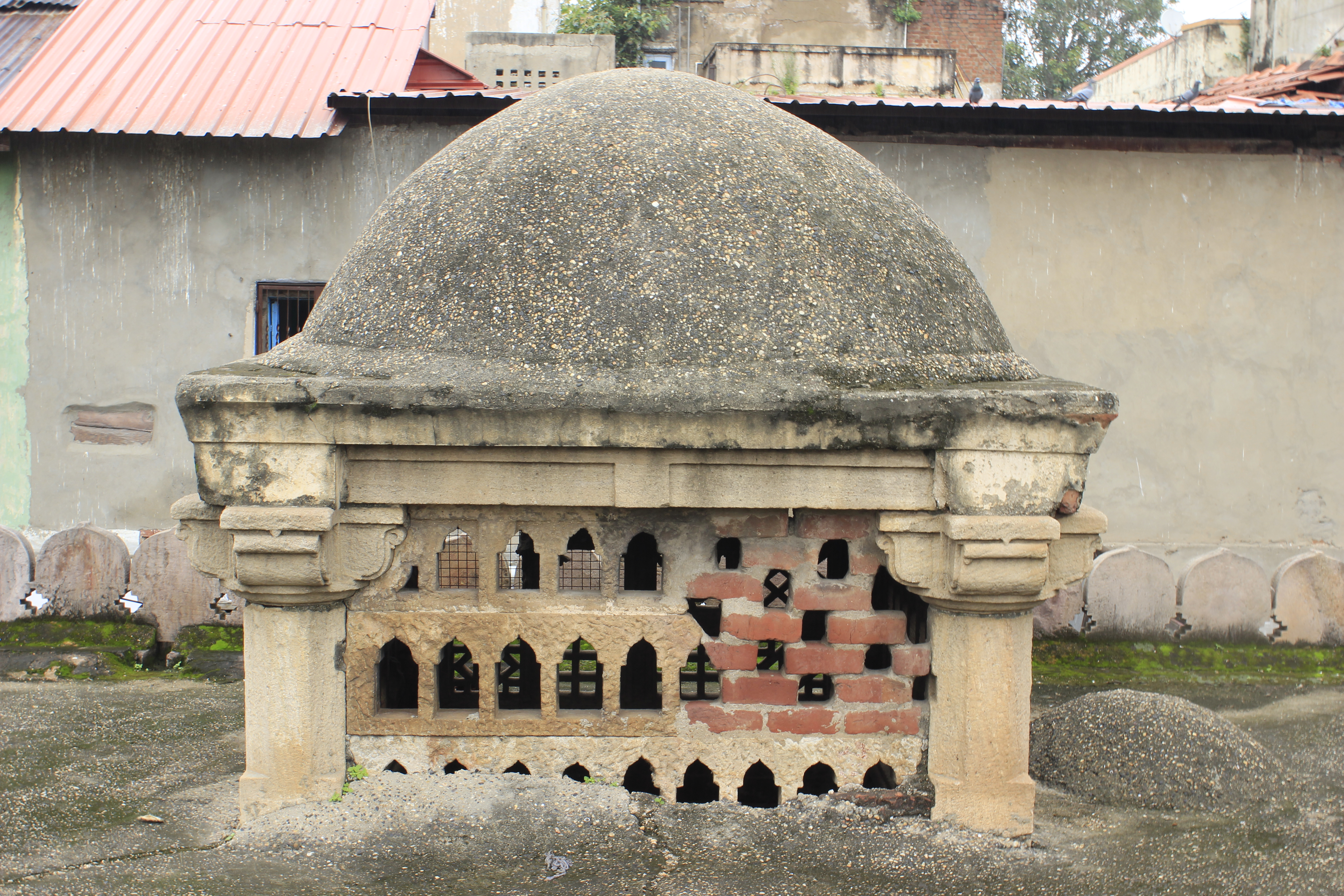
Outer view of the domes

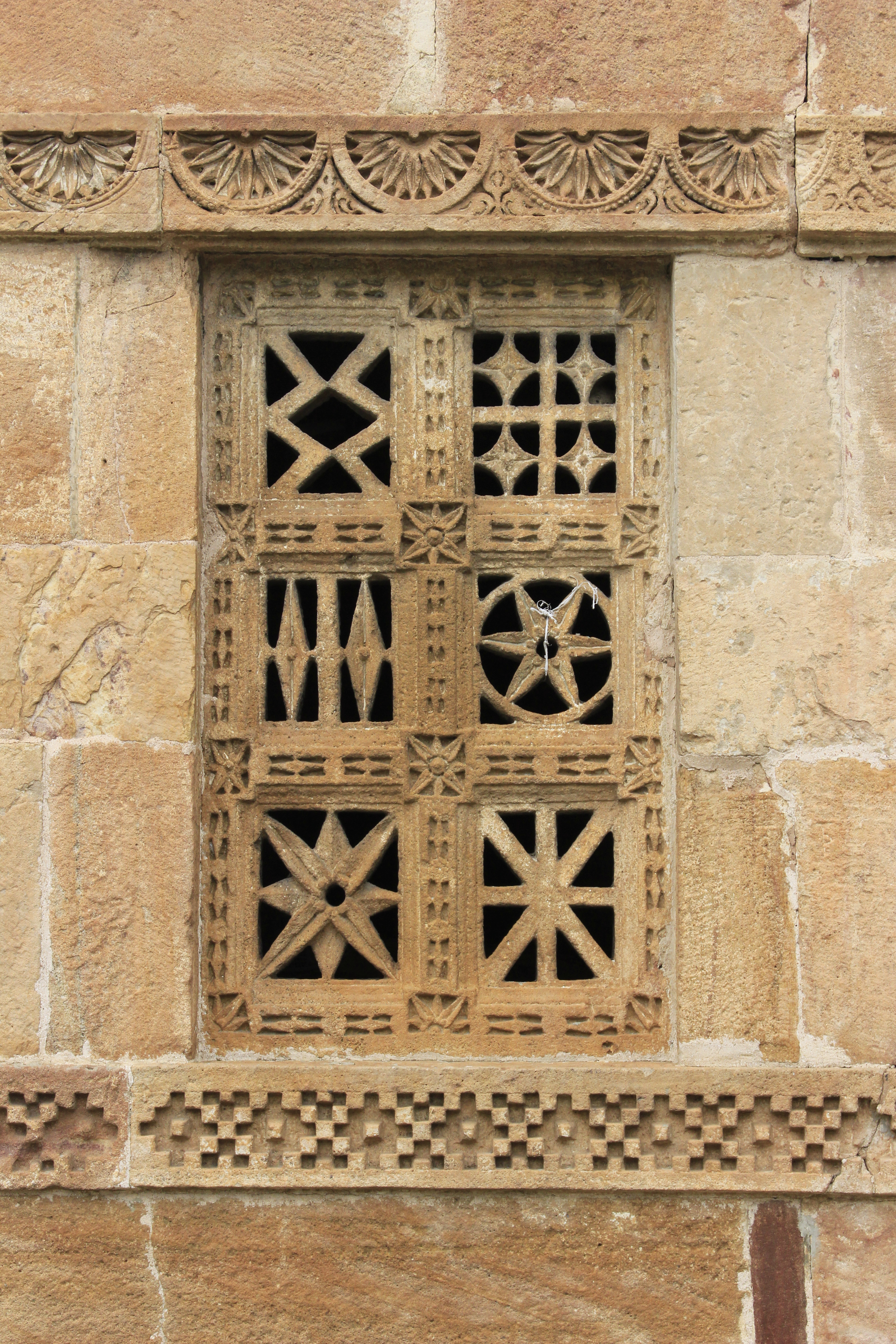
Lattice work in windows of tomb

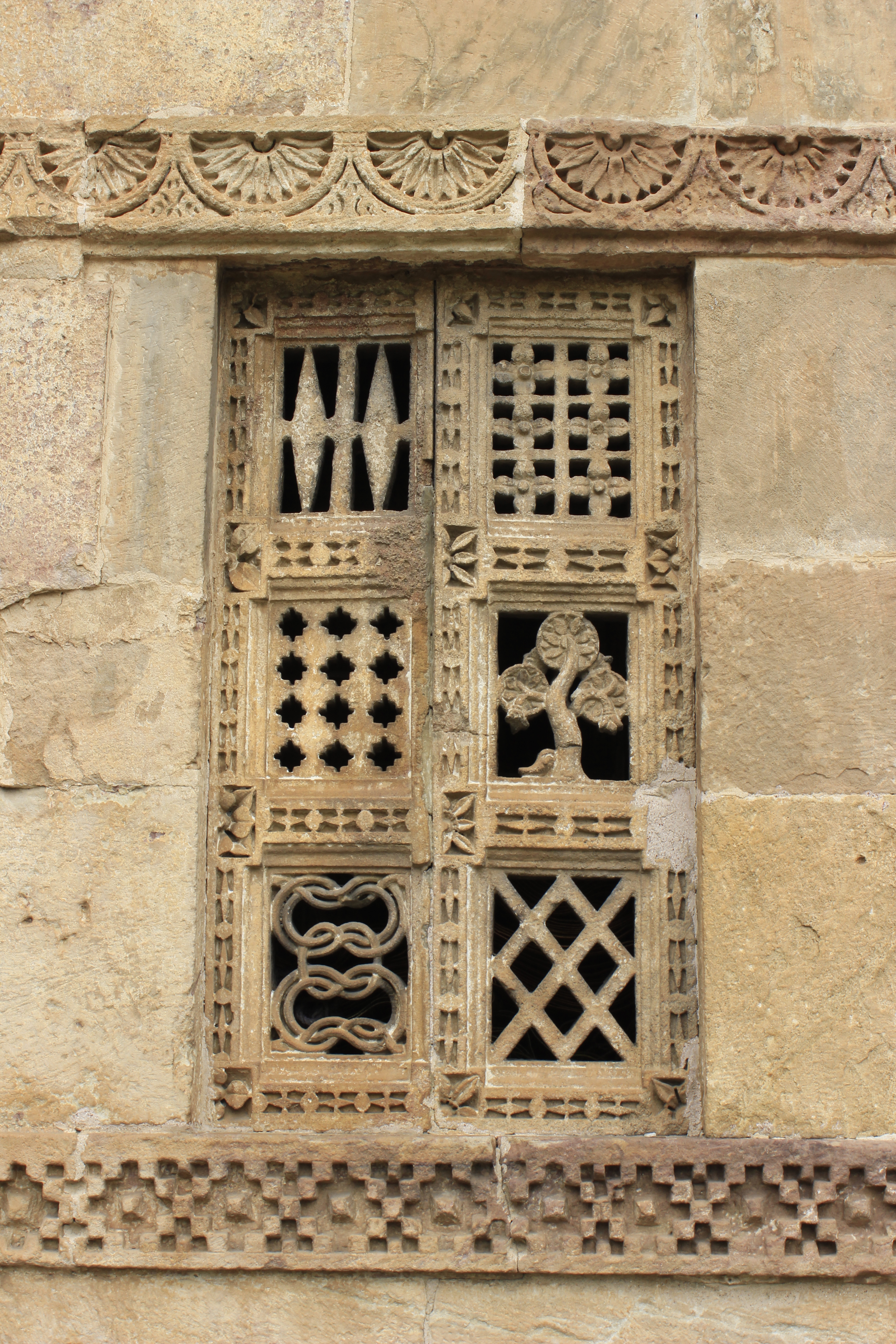
Lattice work

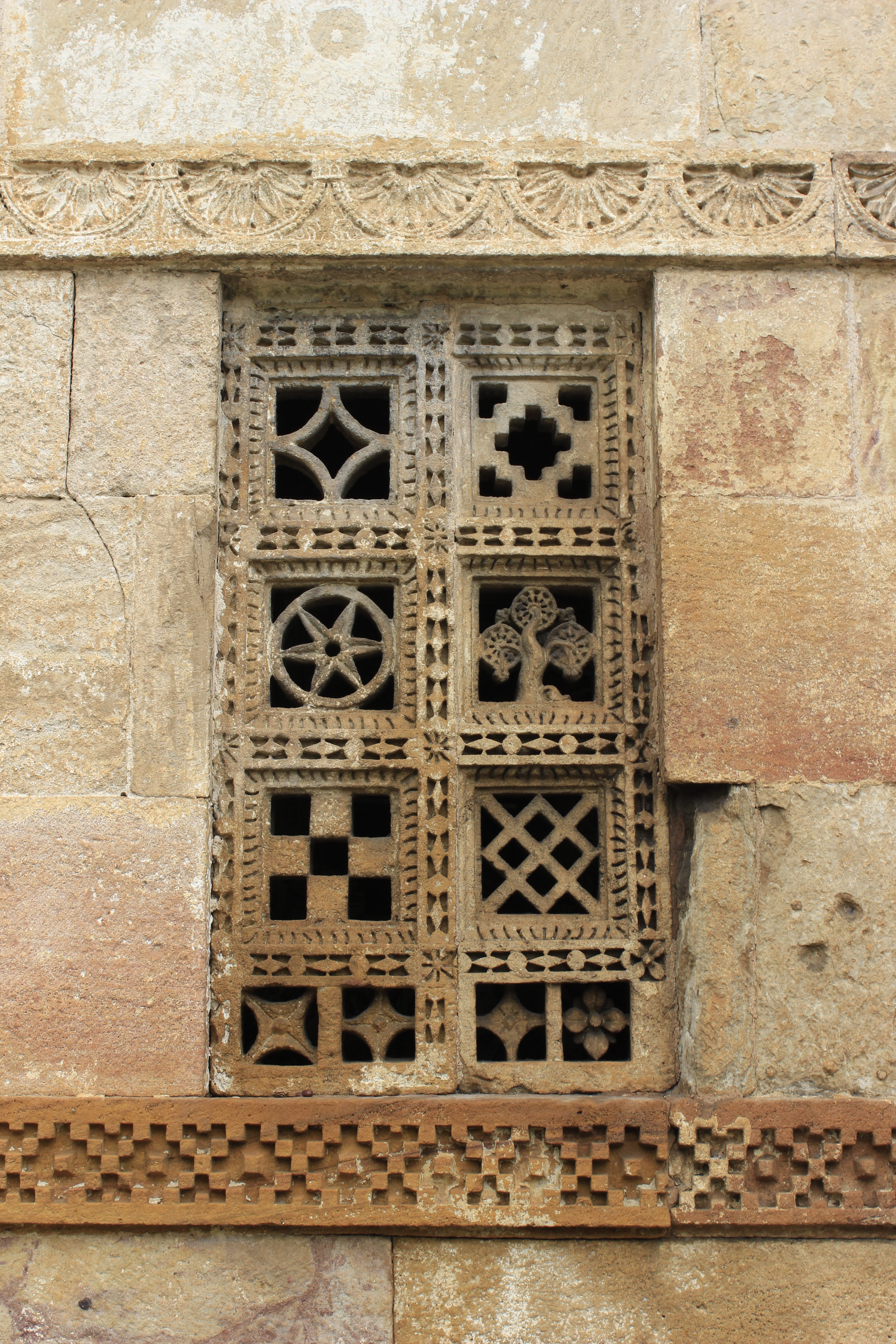
Lattice work

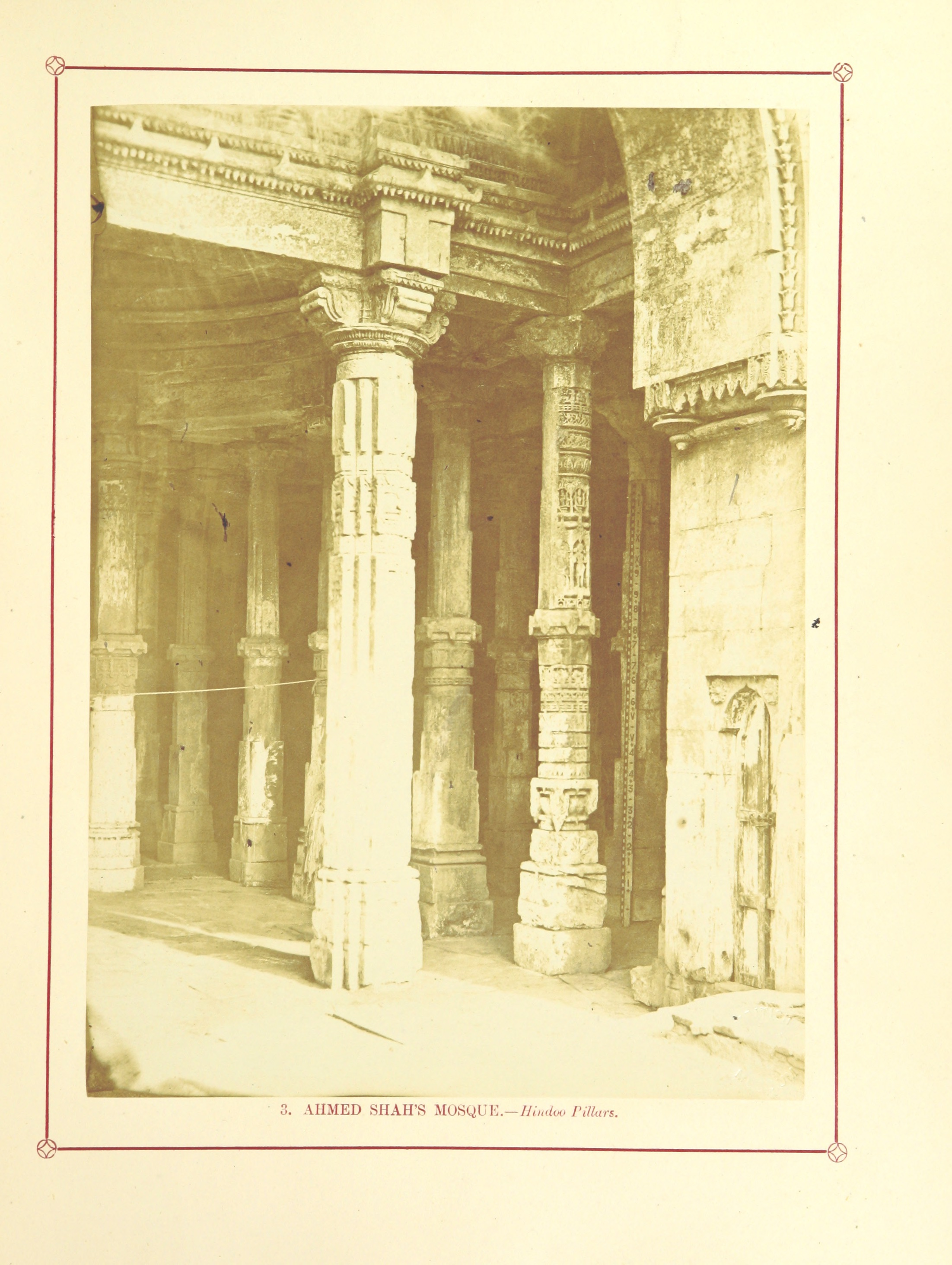
Hindoo pillars

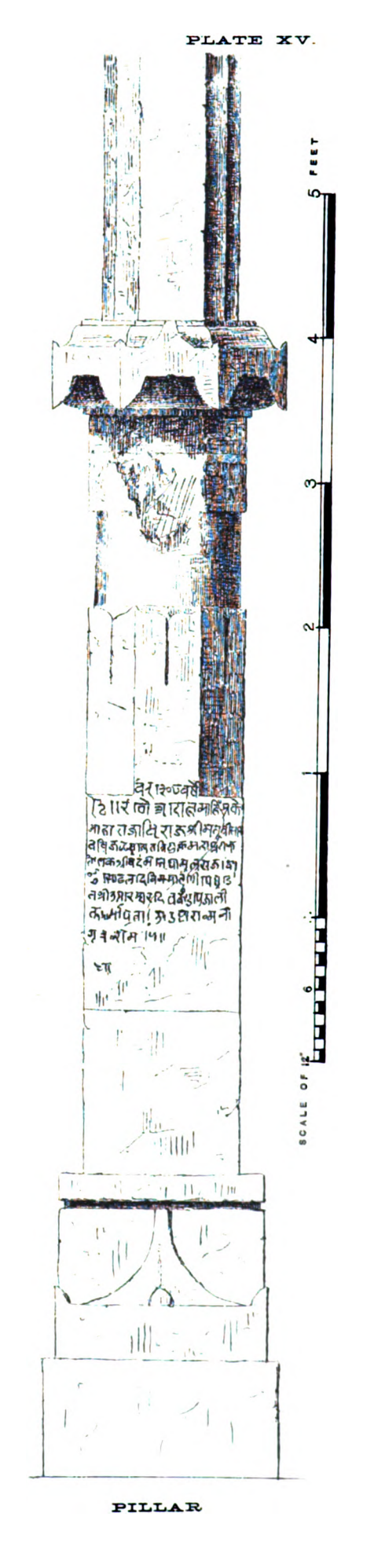
Pillar containing Vaghela-era inscription

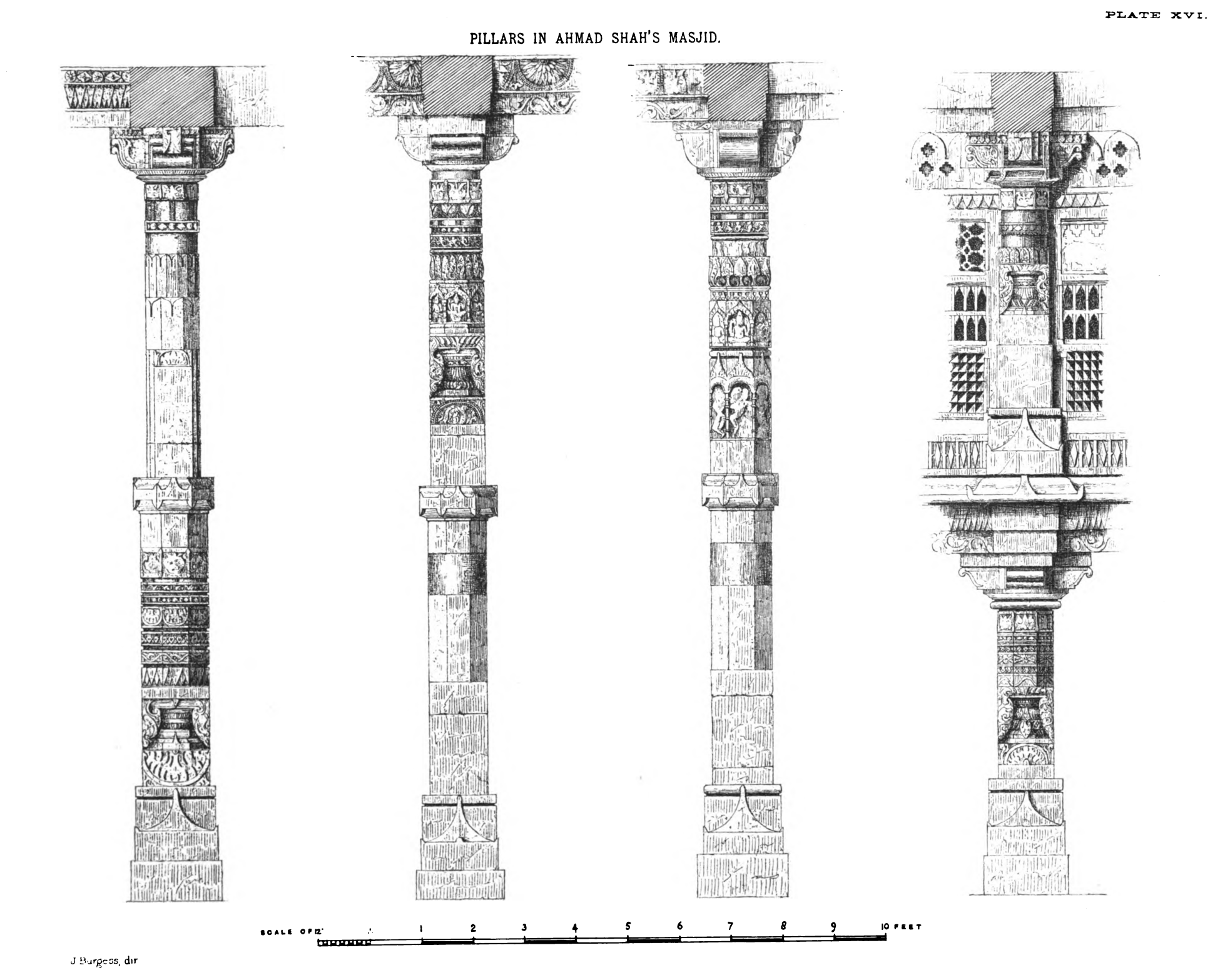
Pillars bearing figures and motifs

== See also ==
- Islam in India
- List of mosques in India
- List of Monuments of National Importance in Gujarat
- Oldest mosque in India
