= Paliad =

- village
- Location in Gujarat, India Paliad (India)
- Coordinates: 23°22′50″N 72°33′06″E
- Country: India
- State: Gujarat
- District: Gandhinagar

Languages
  - Official: Gujarati, Hindi
- Time zone: UTC+5:30 (IST)
- PIN: 382735
- Telephone code: 2764
- Vehicle registration: GJ
- Website: gujaratindia.com

Paliyad, also spelled Paliyad, is a village located in the district of Gandhinagar, Gujarat, western India.

== Education ==
There are primary, secondary and higher secondary schools in the village: Paliyad Gujarati Shala, Shri paliyad madhyamik and ucchatar madhayamik highschool and Shree sarswati vidhyalaya paliyad

== Healthcare ==
The S. J. Patel Sarvajanik Hospital serves the medical needs of the area.

== Temples ==
There are several major temples scattered throughout the village.

- BAPS Swaminarayan Mandir Paliad
- Varahi Mata Temple
- Ramji Temple (newly renovated)
- Ambaji Temple
- Gayatri Temple
- Mahakali Temple
- Mahadev Temple
- Khodiyar Temple
- Jhogani Temple
- In Paliyad Raval Kuldevi Temple - Kuldevi Name Sullai Maa.....as Paresh Raval is from Paliyad...

== Famous locals ==
- Patel Bumikaben Nitinbhai Sarpanch
- Arvindbhai Gandabhai Patel (MLA 2017 GUJARAT ASSEMBLY - Dalal)
- Indian actor and comedian Paresh Rawal was born in Paliad
- Suresh Patel (MLA 2017 Mansa constituency )
- Paresh Rawal (actor)
