= Jafar Khan (Gujarat Sultanate) =

Prince Jafar Khan was the son of Ahmad Shah I, King of Gujarat Sultanate from 1411 to 1443. In 1429–1430, Ahmad Shah I Wali of the Bahmani Sultanate of Deccan captured Salsette, Mahim and Mumbra in Mumbai. Ahmad Shah I retaliated by sending his son Jafar Khan to recapture the lost territory. Jafar emerged victorious in the battle fought between him and Ahmad Shah I Wali. In 1431, Mahim and Mumbra were recaptured by the Sultanate of Gujarat.
