= Muhammad Shah II =

Sultan of Gujarat from 1442 to 1451

Sultan of Gujarat
- Reign: 1442 – 12 February 1451
- Predecessor: Ahmad Shah I
- Successor: Ahmad Shah II
- Born: Karim Khan c. 1423
- Died: 12 February 1451 (aged 27–28); Ahmedabad, Gujarat Sultanate
- Burial: Ahmad Shah's Tomb, Ahmedabad
- Spouse: Bibi Mughli; A daughter of Rao Bhan of Idar
- Issue: Ahmad Shah II; Sikandar Khan; Mahmud Begada; A daughter, married Khudawand Khan
Regnal name
- Muizz-ud-Din Muhammad Shah II
Posthumous name
- Khûdáigán-i-Karím
- Dynasty: Muzaffarid
- Father: Ahmad Shah I
- Religion: Islam

Muizz-ud-Din Muhammad Shah II (Karim Khan; c. 1423 – 12 February 1451) was a ruler of the Muzaffarid dynasty, who reigned over the Gujarat Sultanate from 1442 to 1451. He expanded and strengthened the Sultanate.

== Reign ==
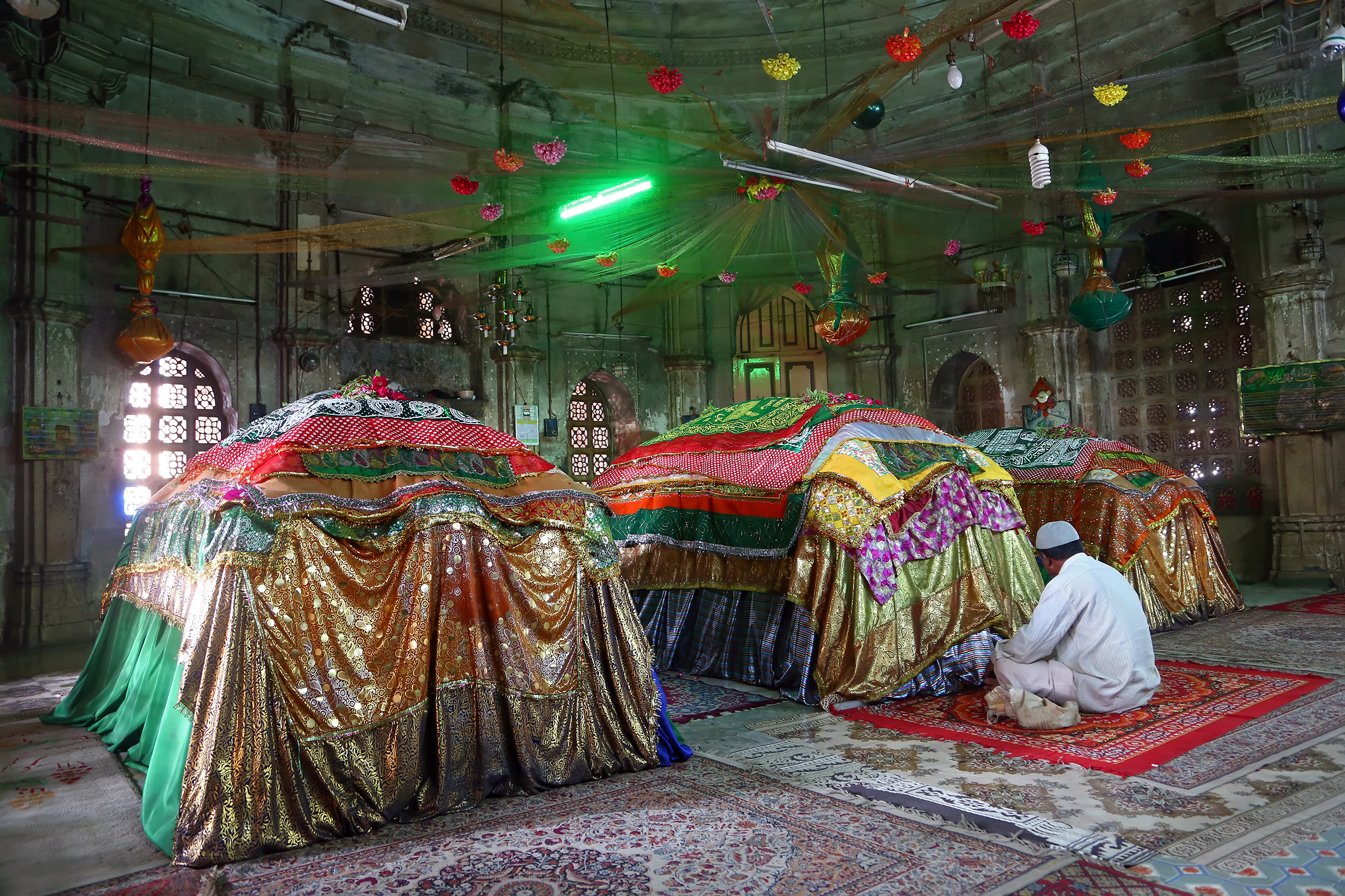
His tomb beside his father Ahmad Shah's Tomb, Ahmedabad

Ahmad Shah I was succeeded by his generous pleasure-loving son Muhammad Sháh, Ghiás-ud-dunya Wad-dín, also styled Zarbaksh the Gold Giver.

In 1445, Muhammad marched against Rao Bhan of Idar State, but on that chief agreeing to pay tribute he confirmed him in the possession of his state. Muhammad also married a daughter of Rao Bhan. His next expedition was against Kánha Rái of Dungarpur, who took refuge in the hills, but afterwards returned, and paying tribute, was given charge of his country. Muhammad married Bíbi Mughli, daughter of Jam Tughlaq, also known as Jam Juna II of Samma dynasty ruling from Samanagar in Sindh. She bore a son, Fateh Khán, who was afterwards became well known as Sultán Mahmud Begada. In 1450, Muhammad marched upon Champaner, and took the lower fortress. Gangádás of Chámpáner had a strong ally in Sultán Mahmúd Khilji, the ruler of Malwa Sultanate, and on his approach Muhammad Sháh retired to Godhra, and Mahmúd Khilji continued his march upon Gujarát at the head of 80,000 horse. Muhammad Sháh was preparing to fly to Diu, when the nobles, disgusted at his cowardice, caused him to be poisoned. Other sources say, on the return journey, he fell seriously ill and died in February, 1451. Muhammad Sháh’s after-death title is Khûdáigán-i-Karím, the Gracious Lord. He was buried left to his father Ahmad Shah's Tomb in Manek Chowk, Ahmedabad.

His known children include:

- Jalal Khan, his oldest son, who succeeded him as Ahmad Shah II.
- Sikandar Khan, who served with his older brother at the battle of Kapdavanj against Mahmud Khalji of Malwa.
- Fateh Khan, who succeeded his older brother as Mahmud Begada.
- A daughter, who married Khudawand Khan, an important noble in the court of Mahmud Begada.
