= Ahmad Shah I =

Sultan of Gujarat from 1411 to 1442

- Sultan of Gujarat
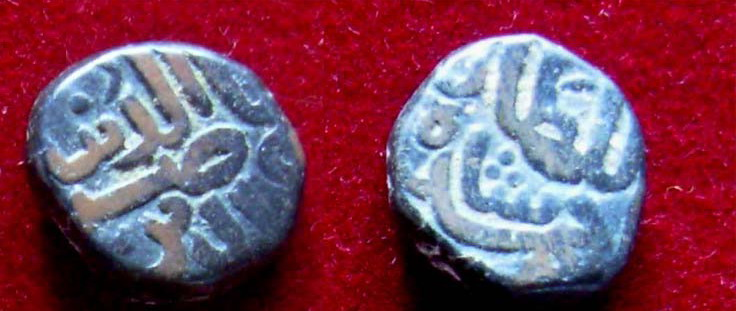
- Silver coin of Ahmad Shah

3rd Sultan of Gujarat
- Reign: 10 January 1411 – 12 August 1442
- Predecessor: Muzaffar Shah I
- Successor: Muhammad Shah II
- Born: 17 November 1391
- Died: 12 August 1442 (aged 50)
- Burial: 1442; Ahmad Shah's Tomb, Ahmedabad
- Spouse: Lala Baghela; A daughter of Sumant Singh of Behol; Raniba, daughter of Rawal Satrasalji of Matar
- Issue: Muhammad Shah II; Daud Shah; Zafar Khan; Fateh Khan; Mubarak Khan; Habib Khan; Shakar Khan; 33 more sons
Names
- Násir-ud-dunya Wad-dín Abúl fateh Ahmed Shah
- Dynasty: Muzaffarid
- Father: Muhammad Shah I (Tatar Khan)
- Religion: Islam

Nasir-ud-Din Ahmad Shah I (born Ahmad Khan; 17 November 1391 – 12 August 1442) was a ruler of the Muzaffarid dynasty, who reigned over the Gujarat Sultanate from 1411 until his death in 1442. He was the grandson of Sultan Muzaffar Shah, founder of the dynasty.

The founder of Ahmedabad, Gujarat's most populous city which carries his name, he was also a poet, having written a collection of Persian poetry.

== Early life ==
Ahmad Shah was born on 17 November 1391 to Muhammad Shah I alias Tatar Khan who was a son of Muzaffar Shah I. Muhammad Shah I was probably killed by his uncle Shams Khan in favour of his father Muzaffar Shah when he imprisoned him.

According to Mirat-i-Ahmadi, he abdicated the throne in favour of his grandson Ahmad Shah in 1410 due to his failing health. He died five months and 13 days later. According to Mirat-i-Sikandari, Ahmad Shah was going to an expedition to quell the rebellion of Kolis of Ashawal. After leaving Patan, he convened an assembly of Ulemas and asked a question that should he took retribution of his father's unjust death. Ulemas replied in favour and he got the written answers. He returned to Patan. Ahmad Shah succeeded him with the title of Nasir-ud-dunya Wad-din Abul fateh Ahmad Shah at the age of 19 in 1411.

== Reign ==
=== War of succession ===
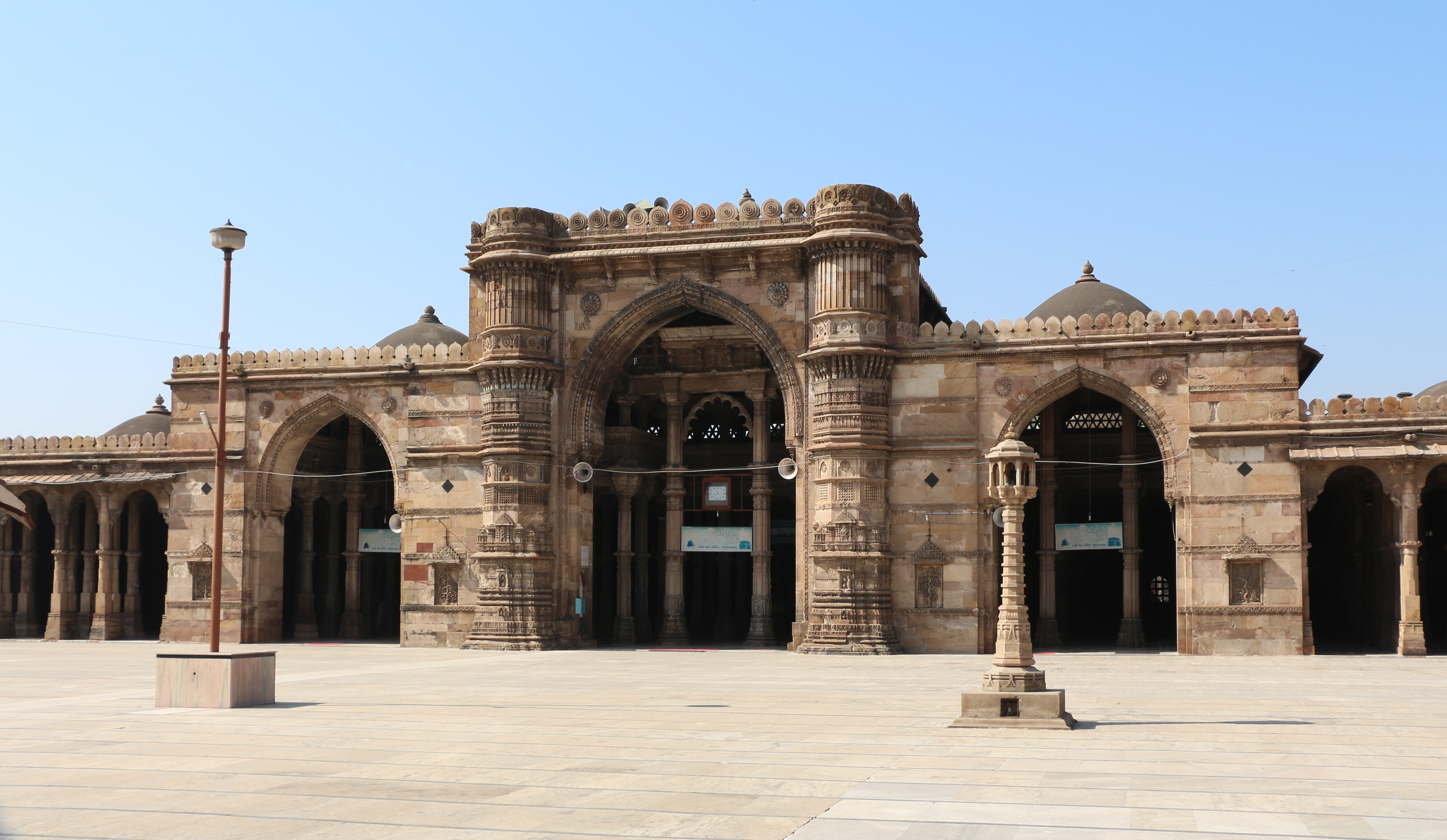
Jama Mosque of Ahmedabad was built by Ahmad Shah in 1424.

Soon after assuming power, his cousin Moid-ud-din Firuz Khan, governor of Vadodara, allying himself with Hisam or Nizam-ul-Mulk Bhandari and other nobles, collected an army at Nadiad, and, laying claim to the crown, defeated the king's followers. Jivandas, one of the insurgents, proposed to march upon Patan, but as the others refused a dispute arose in which Jivandas was slain, and the rest sought and obtained Ahmad Shah's forgiveness. Moid-ud-din Firuz Khan went to Khambhat and was there joined by Masti Khan, son of Muzaffar Shah, who was governor of Surat; on Ahmad Shah's advance they fled from Khambhat to Bharuch, to which fort Ahmad Shah laid siege. As soon as the king arrived, Moid-ud-din's army went over to the king, and Masti Khan also submitted. After a few days Ahmad Shah sent for and forgave Moid-ud-din, and returned to Asawal (future Ahmedabad). Moid-ud-din was moved from Vadodara to Navsari.

=== Foundation of Ahmedabad ===
Ahmad Shah, while camping on the banks of the Sabarmati River, saw a hare chasing a dog. The sultan was intrigued by this and asked his spiritual adviser for explanation; the latter pointed out unique characteristics in the land which nurtured such rare qualities which turned a timid hare to chase a ferocious dog. The sultan, who had been looking for a place to build his new capital in the centre of his domain, was impressed by this. Ahmad Shah laid the foundation of the city at the site of Asawal on 26 February 1411 (at 1:20 pm, Thursday, the second day of Dhu al-Qi'dah, Hijri year 813) at Manek Burj. He chose it as the new capital on 4 March 1411. Ahmad Shah named it Ahmedabad, in honour of four Ahmads: himself, his religious teacher Shaikh Ahmad Khattu Ganj Baksh, and two others, Kazi Ahmad and Malik Ahmad. (Note: Shaikh Ahmad Khattu is buried at Sarkhej Roza. Kazi Ahmad is buried at Patan and Malik Ahmad is buried near Kalupur Gate in Ahmedabad.) The new capital was surrounded by the Bhadra Fort.

In the following year (1413–14 AD) Ahmad Shah defeated Asha Bhil, chief of Asawal. He built Ahmad Shah's Mosque and Jama Mosque (1424) in Ahmedabad.

=== Consolidation of Sultanate ===
During 1414, Moid-ud-din Firuz Khan and Masti Khan again revolted, and, joining the Rao of Idar State, took shelter in that fortress. A force under Fateh Khan was despatched against the rebels, and finally Firuz Khan and the Rao of Idar were forced to flee by way of Kheralu. Moid-ud-din now persuaded Rukn Khan governor of Modasa, fifty miles north of Ahmedabad, to join. They united their forces with those of Badri-ula, Masti Khan, and Ranmal-the Rao of Ídar and encamped at Rangpura, an Ídar village about five miles from Modasa and began to strengthen Modasa and dig a ditch round it. The Ahmad Shah camped before the fort and offered favourable terms. The besieged bent on treachery asked the Ahmad Shah to send Nizam-ul-Mulk the minister and certain other great nobles. The Sultan agreed, and the besieged imprisoned the envoys. After a three days' siege Modasa fell. Badri-ula and Rukn Khan were slain, and Firuz Khan and the Rao of Ídar fled. The imprisoned nobles were released unharmed. The Rao seeing that all hope of success was gone, made his peace with the king by surrendering to him the elephants, horses and other baggage of Moid-ud-din Firuz Khan and Masti Khan, who now fled to Nagor, where they were sheltered by Shams Khan Dandani. Ahmad Shah after levying the stipulated tribute departed. Moid-ud-din Firuz Khan was afterwards slain in the war between Shams Khan and Rana Mokal of Chittor. In 1414–15 AD, Uthman Ahmed and Sheikh Malik, in command at Patan, and Sulaiman Afghan called Azam Khan, and Ísa Salar rebelled, and wrote secretly to Sultan Hushang of Malwa Sultanate, inviting him to invade Gujarat, and promising to seat him on the throne and expel Ahmad Shah. They were joined in their rebellion by Jhala Satarsalji of Patdi and other chiefs of Gujarat. Ahmad Shah despatched Latif Khan and Nizam-ul-Mulk against Sheikh Malik and his associates, while he sent Imad-ul-Mulk against Sultan Hushang, who retired, and Imad-ul-Mulk, after plundering Malwa, returned to Gujarat. Latif Khan, pressing in hot pursuit of Satarsal and Sheikh Malik, drove them to Sorath. Ahmad Shah returned to Ahmedabad.

==== Sorath and Junagadh ====
Sorath was ruled by Chudasama king Ra Mokalasimha. He had to move the capital from Junagadh to Vanthali due to order from the Governor of Gujarat Zafar Khan (grandfather of Ahmad Shah) on behalf of Delhi Sultan Firuz Shah Tughluq. Zafar Khan had occupied his capital Junagadh in 1395–96. In 1414, his son Meliga regained Junagadh and also gave refuge to some of rebels (probably Jhala chief Satrasal). This irked Ahmad Shah and he attacked Sorath. Ahmad Shah won pitched battle at Vanthali in 1413. Later he imposed siege of Junagadh in 1414. Meliga retired to the hill fortress of Girnar. Ahmad Shah, though unable to capture the hill, gained the fortified citadel of Junagaḍh. Finding further resistance vain, the chief tendered his submission, and Junagaḍh was admitted among the tributary states. Several other Sorath chief also submitted. Sayad Abul Khair and Sayad Kasim were left to collect the tribute, and Ahmad Shah returned to Ahmedabad.

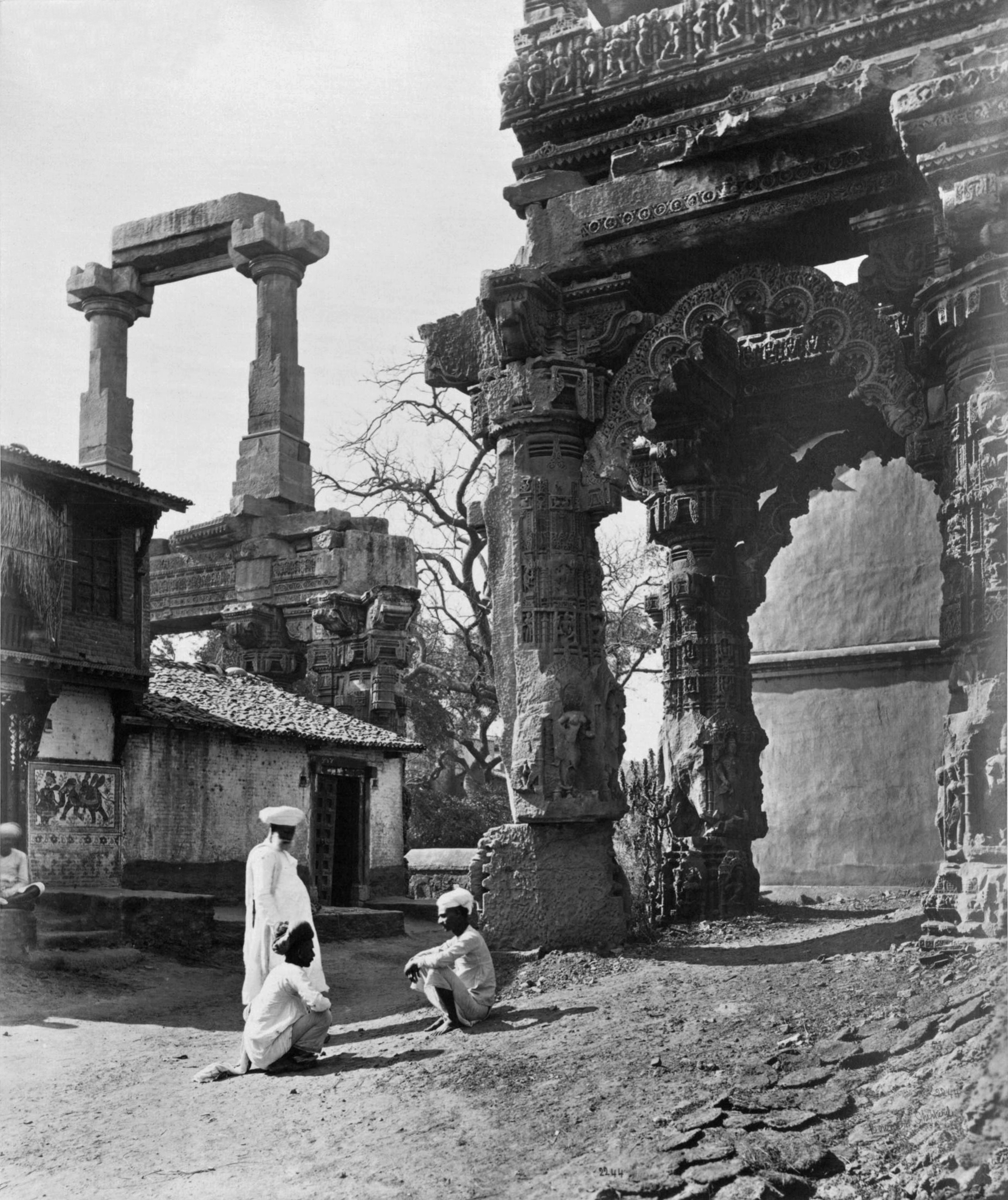
Partially damaged Rudra Mahalaya Temple of Sidhpur was destroyed and western part of it was converted in congregational mosque by Ahmad Shah in 1415. Surviving ruins in 1874.

The partially damaged Rudra Mahalaya Temple of Siddhpur was further destroyed and the western part of it converted into a congregational mosque (Jami mosque) by him in 1415. From Siddhpur, he advanced to Dhar in Malwa. Hindu kings believed that he is attacking Hindu pilgrimage places to bolster his image. So they formed an alliance in 1416 which included Idar, Champaner, jhalawar prant and Nandod. Sultan Hushang Shah of Malwa also agreed to help them.

In 1399, Ahmad aka Malek II, the ruler of Khandesh died. He had divided his kingdom in his princes. Nasir was given east part while Iftikhar aka Hasan was given west. Nasir established Burhanpur in 1400 (Note: Nasir had named Burhanpur after Sufi saint Burhanuddin.) and also won nearby fort of Asir from Hindu king. Hasan settled in Thalner. Nasir won Thalner from Hasan and imprisoned him, with help of his relative Hushang Shah of Malwa, before he receive help from Ahmad Shah. Nasir attacked and imposed siege of Nandarbar and Sultanpur of Gujarat Sultanate in 1417. Ahmed sent an expedition against Nasir of Asir under Malik Mahmud Barki or Turki and left for Modasa. When the Malik reached Nandoḍ he found that Gheirat Khan had fled to Malwa and that Nasir had retired to Thalner. The Malik advanced, besieged and took Thalner, capturing Nasir whom Ahmed forgave and dignified with the title of Khan.

The alliance of Hindu kings rebelled knowing that Ahmad Shah is busy in his expedition against Nasir. As Ahmad Shah returned quickly and went to Modasa, the rebellion broke and all kings returned to their states including Hushang Shah. After quelling these rebellions Ahmad Shah despatched Nizam-ul-Mulk to punish the jhala rajput ruler of Mandal near Viramgam, and himself marched to Malwa against Sultan Hushang in 1418. He reached Ujjain where both armies fought battle. Ahmad Shah won and Hushang Shah took refuge in Mandu. In November 1419, he imposed siege on Champaner (Pavagadh) but later the king Trimbakdas of Champaner relented and agreed to give annual tribute in February 1420. Ahmad Shah later attacked and ravaged Sankheda-Bahadurpur in March 1420. He built a fort at Sankheda and a mosque within the fort; he also built a wall round the town of Mangni, and then marched upon Mandu. On the way ambassadors from Sultan Hushang met him suing for peace. Ahmad Shah later forgave Hushang Shah. On returning towards Champaner, again laid waste the surrounding country. He returned to Ahmedabad in May 1420.

In 1420–21, he started building and repairing forts and establishing military outposts to strengthen state from attacks. He built the forts of Dahod on the Malwa frontier and of Jitpur in Lunawada. In 1421 he repaired the fort in the town of Kahreth, otherwise called Meimun in Lunavaḍa, which had been built by Ulugh Khan Sanjar in the reign of Sultan Ala-ud-din Khalji and changed the name to Sultanpur. In December 1421, he advanced against Malwa and took the fort of Mesar. He attacked and received tributes from other border states before he reached Mandu in March 1422. Hushang Shah was in Jajnagar (Orissa) at that time. After 48 days of unsuccessful siege and several clashes, Ahmad Shah had to move to Ujjain in May due to incoming monsoon. He again imposed siege in September 1421 but Hushang Shah had returned to Mandu with large number of war elephants from Orissa. Ahmad Shah left Mandu knowing that it would be difficult to win. He moved and camped at Sarangpur when he was reached by ambassadors sent by Hushang Shah for treaty of peace. Ahmad Shah agreed but, on the night of 26 December 1421, an army of Hushang Shah attacked the camp. Ahmad Shah repelled the attack but had to endure heavy casualty. Hushang Shah took refuge in fort of Sarangpur. Ahmad Shah again laid siege to Sarangpur. Failing to take the fort, Ahmad Shah decided to return Ahmedabad on 7 March 1423 but he was chased by an army of Hushang Shah. Both armies met and after fierce battle, Ahmad Shah won. He returned to Ahmedabad on 23 May 1423.

=== Idar and Ahmadnagar ===
He spent next two years without any wars and focused on administration and agriculture development. He had known that Rao Punja of Idar State had held talks with Hushang Shah during the last battles. He attacked Idar in 1425. Rao Punja left to hills but the state was ravaged. To keep permanent check on Idar, Ahmad Shah established town of Ahmadnagar (now Himatnagar), on the banks of the Hathmati River, eighteen miles south-west of Idar in 1426 and completed its fort in 1427. Rao Punja left in hiding but kept attacking soldiers and supplies of Sultanate. In 1428, Rao Punja died in ambush with soldiers. In 1428, Ahmad Shah ravaged Vishalnagar (now Visnagar) and ordered to capture all domains of Idar. He later made peace with Harrai, son of Punja, and reverted his state to him on condition of tribute. Ahmad Shah had to again attack and capture Idar in November 1428 when Harrai did not pay tribute. He took the fort and built also an assembly mosque.

Fearing that their turn would come next the jhala rajput king of Zalawad and Kanha apparently chief of Dungarpur fled to Nasir Khan of Asir. Nasir Khan gave Kanha a letter to Ahmad Shah Bahmani, to whose son Ala-ud-din Nasir's daughter was married, and having detached part of his own troops to help Kanha they plundered and laid waste some villages of Nandurbar and Sultanpur. Sultan Ahmed sent his eldest son Muhammad Khan with Mukarrabul Mulk and others to meet the Dakhanis who were repulsed with considerable loss. On this Sultan Ahmed Bahmani, under Kadr Khan Dakhani, sent his eldest son Ala-ud-din and his second son Khan Jehan against the Gujaratis. Kadr Khan marched to Daulatabad and joining Nasir Khan and the Gujarat rebels fought a great battle near the pass of Manek Puj, six miles south of Nandgaon in Nasik. The confederates were defeated with great slaughter. The Dakhan princes fled to Daulatabad and Kanha and Nasir Khan to Kalanda near Chalisgaum in south Khandesh.

=== Mahim and Baglan ===
In 1429, on the death of Kutub Khan, the Gujarat governor of the island of Mahim (now neighbourhood of Mumbai), Ahmad Shah of Bahmani Sultanate smarting under his defeats, ordered Hasan Izzat, otherwise called Malik-ut-Tujjar, to the Konkan and by the Malik's activity the North Konkan passed to the Deccans. On the news of this, Ahmad Shah sent his youngest son Zafar Khan, with an army under Malik Iftikhar Khan, to retake Mahim. A fleet, collected from Diu, Ghogha and Khambhat sailed to the Konkan, attacked Thane by sea and land, captured it, and regained possession of Mahim.

In 1431, Ahmad Shah advanced upon Champaner, and Ahmad Shah Bahmani, anxious to retrieve his defeat at Mahim, marched an army into and Baglan, and laid it waste. This news brought Ahmad Shah back to Nandurbar. Destroying Nandod he passed to Tambol, a fort in Baglan which Ahmad Shah Bahmani was besieging, defeated the besiegers and relieved the fort. He then went to Thane, repaired the fort, and returned to Gujarat by way of Sultanpur and Nandurbar. In 1432, after contracting his son Fateh Khan in marriage with the daughter of the Rai of Mahim to the north of Bassein (now Vasai), Ahmad Shah marched towards Nagor, and exacted tribute and presents from the Raval of Dungarpur. From Dungarpur he went to Mewad, enforcing his claims on Bundi and Kota, two Hara Rajput states in south-east Rajputana. He then entered the Delvada country, levelling temples and destroying the palace of Rana Mokalsingh, the chief of Chittor. Then he invaded Nagor in the country of the Rathoḍs, who submitted to him. After this he returned to Gujarat, and during the next few years was warring principally in Malwa, where, according to Farishtah, his army suffered greatly from pestilence and famine.

== Family ==
Ahmed Shah I had married a daughter of Sumant Singh, the chief of Behol. He also married Raniba, a daughter of Rawal Satrasalji of Matar. According to Ras Mala, Ahmed Shah I also married Lala Baghela, a sister of Warhoji and Jitoji Baghela of Patan, who was his favorite wife. According to seventeenth century Portuguese historian Manuel de Faria e Sousa, Ahmed Shah had forty sons. Among them, the known sons are:

- Karim Khan, his oldest son, who succeeded him as Muhammad Shah II.
- Daud Khan, who was enthroned as Sultan Daud Shah after the death of his oldest nephew, Ahmad Shah II. He had appointed lowborn men to high offices, and as such he was deposed soon after in favor of his younger nephew Fateh Khan, who succeeded him as Mahmud Begada. Daud afterwards became a religious ascetic.
- Zafar Khan. He served as a general during his father's campaign against the Bahmani Sultanate.
- Fateh Khan, who was married to a daughter of the Rai of Mahim.
- Mubarak Khan, who had joined the court of Mahmud Khalji, the sultan of Malwa, as a noble.
- Habib Khan, whom the nobles tried to enthrone as sultan soon after Mahmud Begada's ascension, but the coup attempt failed.
- Shakar Khan. His great-grandson, Ahmed Khan, was enthroned as Sultan Ahmad Shah III in 1554.

== Death ==
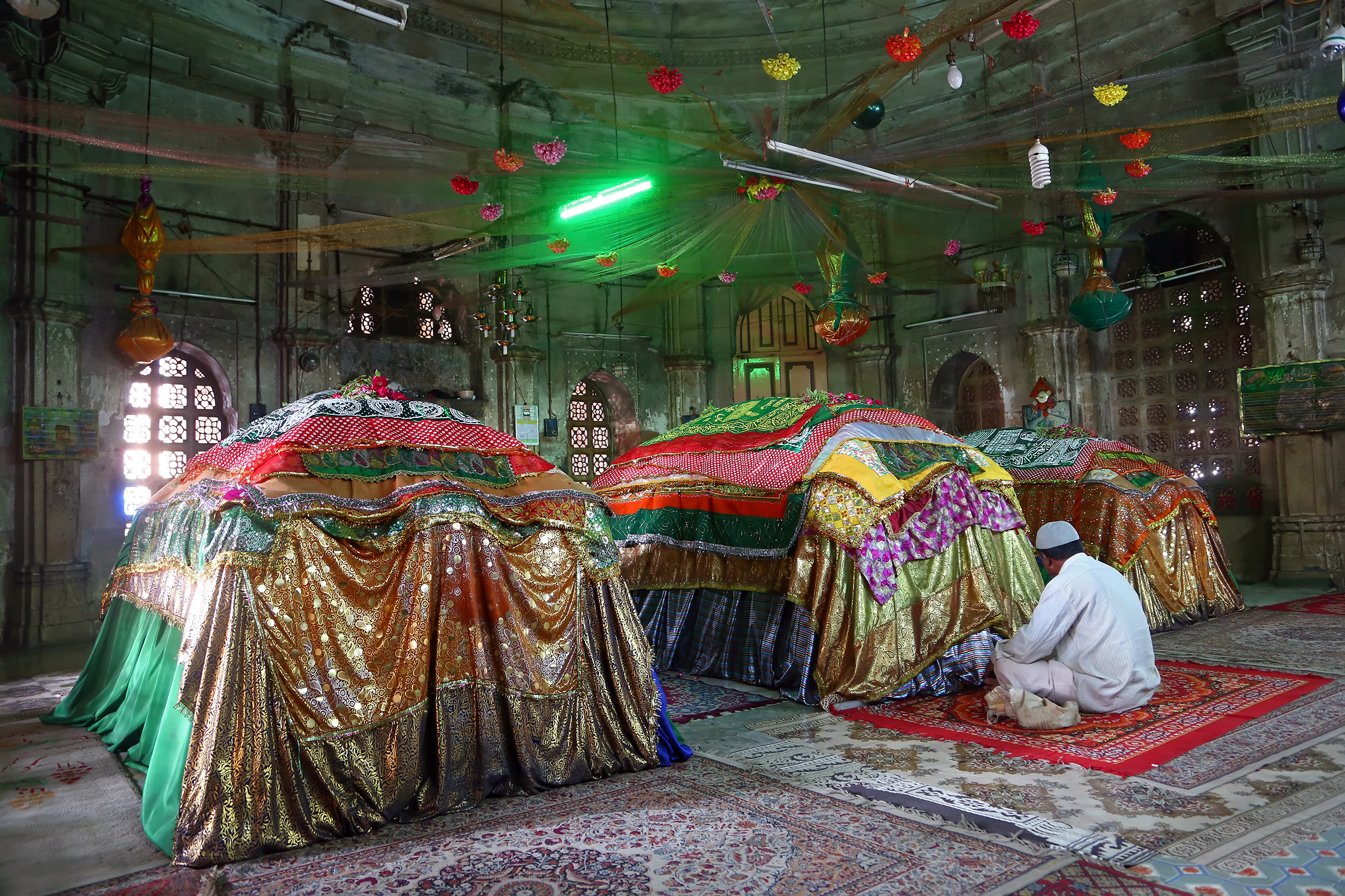
Ahmad Shah's Tomb, Ahmedabad

Ahmed died on 12 August 1442 at the age of 50 and the 33rd year of his reign. He was buried in the mausoleum, Badshah no Hajiro, near Manek Chowk, Ahmedabad.

His after-death title is Khudaigan-i-Maghfur the Forgiven Lord. His queens were buried at Rani no Hajiro, just opposite his mausoleum.

== Legacy ==
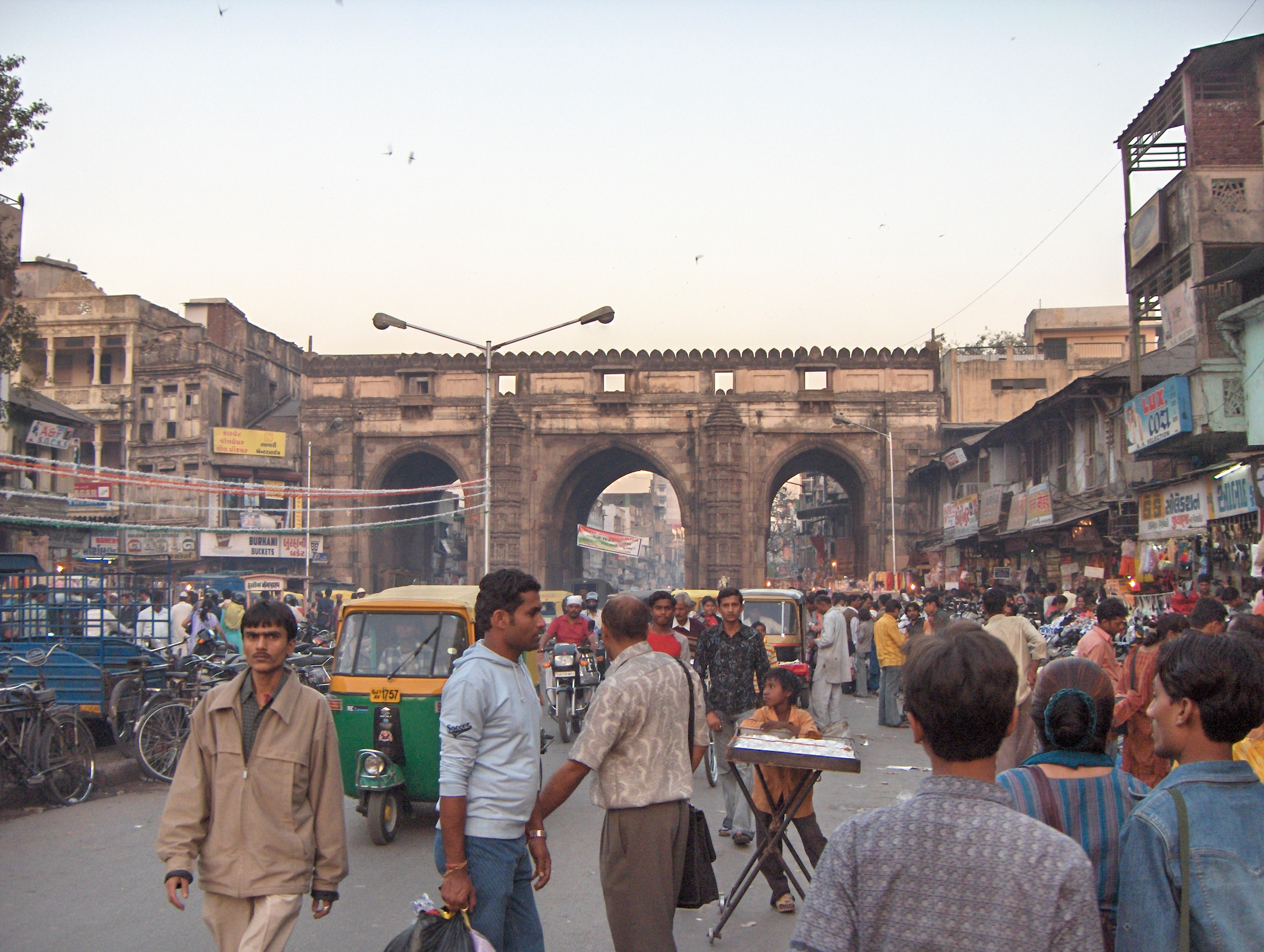
The Teen Darwaza (Triple Gateway) in Ahmedabad, built by Ahmad Shah I

He is honoured for his bravery, skill, and success as a war leader as well as for his piety and his justice. His piety showed itself in his respect for three great religious teachers: Sheikh Rukn-ud-din, the representative of Sheikh Moinuddin Chishti, Khwajah of Ajmer; Sheikh Ahmed Khattu who is buried at Sarkhej Roza, Ahmedabad; and the Bukharan Sheikh Burhan-ud-din known as Kutbi Alam the father of the more famous Shah Alam.

Of Ahmed's justice two instances are recorded. Sitting in the window of his palace watching the Sabarmati River in flood Ahmed saw a large earthen jar float by. The jar was opened and the body of a murdered man was found wrapped in a blanket. The potters were called and one said the jar was his and had been sold to the headman of a neighbouring village. On inquiry the headman was proved to have murdered a grain merchant and was hanged. The second case was the murder of a poor man by Ahmed's son-in-law. The Kazi found the relations of the deceased willing to accept a blood fine and when the fine was paid released the prince. Ahmed hearing of his son-in-law's release said in the case of the rich fine is no punishment and ordered his son-in-law to be hanged.
