= Gujarat under the Delhi Sultanate =

History of Gujarat between 1297–1407

Gujarat گجرات (Persian) Gujarāta (Gujarati)
- Governorate of Delhi Sultanate
- 1297–1407
- The Gujarat Governorate and main South Asian polities in 1400 CE.
- Capital: Patan
- Government
  - Type: Monarchy
- History
  - Established: 1297
  - Disestablished: 1407
| Preceded by | Succeeded by |
| Chaulukya dynasty | Gujarat Sultanate |
- Today part of: India

Gujarat, a region in western India, fell under the Delhi Sultanate following repeated expeditions under Alauddin Khalji around the end of the 13th century. He conquered the Kingdom of Gujarat which had been under the rule of the Vaghela dynasty under Karna II and established Muslim rule in Gujarat. Soon the Tughluq dynasty came to power in Delhi whose emperor carried out expeditions to quell rebellion in Gujarat and established their firm control over the region by the end of the century. Following Timur's invasion of Delhi, the Delhi Sultanate weakened considerably so that the last Tughluq governor Zafar Khan declared himself independent in 1407 and formally established the Gujarat Sultanate.

== Background ==
Due to the long coast of Gujarat, Muslim presence on its shores has been recorded since the 8th century due to economic and cultural reasons.

Gujarat remained free from interference of Muslim rulers except for the expedition of Mahmud Ghazni against the Somnath Temple in 1024; the defeat of Muhammad of Ghor by Chaulukya King Bhima II of Aṇahilaváḍa (now Patan, Gujarat) in about 1178; the Ghurid campaigns in 1172 and 1197; and the avenging sack of Aṇahilaváḍa and defeat of Bhíma by Mamluk Emperor Qutb al-Din Aibak in 1194, until the reign of Alá-ud-dín Khalji (1295–1315). (Note: The Mirăt-i-Áhmedi gives an account of an expedition by one Alif khán a noble of Sultán Sanjar’s against Aṇahilaváḍa in 1257. He is said to have built the large stone mosque without the city. Alif khán returned unsuccessful, but not without levying tribute.)

In the second half of the 13th century, Cambay (now Khambhat) was under Muslim official Shihabuddin ibn Muhammad ibn Yahya who must have been appointed under Chaulukya-Vaghela rulers.

== Governors under Khalji dynasty ==
In 1297, Ulugh Khan, general and brother of Alá-ud-dín Khalji, and Nasrat Khán Wazír were sent against Aṇahilaváḍa. They took the city expelling Karna II of Vaghela dynasty, who took refuge in Deccan. They next seized Khambhat, and, after appointing a local governor, returned to Delhi. Ulugh Khán consolidated the conquest by repeated expeditions. The Kanhadade Prabandha says that he plundered Somnath, and there is no doubt that he conquered Jalore (the ancient Jhálindar) from the Songadha Chauháns. Ulugh Khán died circa 1301–1302.

Alp Khan, a brother-in-law of Alá-ud-dín, was appointed as the governor of Gujarat. He had governed Gujarát for few years. At the instigation of Malik Káfur, he was recalled and put to death by the emperor Alá-ud-dín Khalji in 1316. The Jain works praise Alp Khan for allowing reconstruction of the shrines destroyed by the Muslim conquerors. Kakka Suri's Nabhi-nandana-jinoddhara-prabandha records the Shatrunjaya temple renovation permitted by him.

Alp Khán’s execution shook Muslim power in Gujarát, and Kamál-ud-dín, whom Mubárak Khalji sent to quell the disturbances, was slain in battle. Sedition spread till Ain-ul-Mulk Multáni arrived with a powerful army, defeated the rebels and restored order. He was succeeded by Zafar Khán, who after completing the subjection of the country was recalled, and his place supplied by Hisám-ud-dín Parmár. (Note: According to Ziá Barni (Elliot, III. 218) Hisám-ud-dín was the mother’s brother, according to others he was the brother of Hasan afterwards Khusraw Khán Parmár the favourite of Mubárak Sháh. On coming to Gujarát Hisám-ud-dín collected his Parmár kindred and revolted, but the nobles joining against him seized him and sent him to Dehli. To their disgust Mubárak in his infatuation for Hisám-ud-dín’s nephew or brother, after slapping Hisám-ud-dín on the face set him at liberty.) This officer, showing treasonable intentions, was imprisoned and succeeded by Malik Wájid-ud-dín Kuraishi, who was afterwards ennobled by the title of Táj or Sadr-ul-Mulk. Khusraw Khán Parmár was then appointed governor, but it is not clear whether he ever joined his appointment.

== Governors under Tughluq dynasty ==
=== Táj-ul-Mulk, 1320 and successors ===
The next governor to whom reference is made is Táj-ul-Mulk, who about 1320, was, for the second time, chosen as governor by Sultán Ghiás-ud-dín Tughluq. He was succeeded by Malik Mukbil, who held the titles of Khán Jahán and Náib-i-Mukhtár, and who was appointed by the Emperor Muhammad bin Tughluq (1325–1351).

Subsequently, Muhammad bin Tughluq granted the government of Gujarát to Áhmad Ayáz, Malik Mukbil continuing to act as his deputy. Afterwards when Áhmad Ayáz, who received the title of Khwájah Jahán, proceeded as governor to Gujarát, Malik Mukbil acted as his minister. And about 1338, when Khwájah Jahán was sent against the emperor’s nephew Karshásp and the Rája of Kampila (Note: In Karnataka, probably on the Tungabhadra River near Vijayanagar. Briggs’ Muhammadan Power in India, I. p. 418 and 428. Briggs speaks of two Kampilás one on the Ganga river and the other on the Tungabhadra near Bijánagar (Vijayanagar).) who had sheltered him, Malik Mukbil succeeded to the post of governor. On one occasion between Baroda and Dabhoi, Malik Mukbil, who was escorting treasure and a caravan of merchants to Delhi, was plundered by some bands of the Amírán-i Sada (Note: literally Captains of Hundreds; singular Amír-i Sada. They held originally small contingents to maintain order in the countryside. Most of them were Mughal converts and the rest were Turk and Afgháns.) Aziz Khammar, the governor of Malwa appointed by the emperor, marched against them and executed 89 of them. At last, about 1346, being joined by certain Muslim nobles and Hindu chieftains, they broke into open rebellion and defeated Ázíz Khammar.

==== The emperor quells an insurrection, 1347 ====
In the following year, 1347, Muhammad bin Tughluq, advancing in person, defeated the rebels, and sacked the towns of Cambay (now Khambhat) and Surat. During the same campaign he drove the Gohil chief Mokhadaji out of his stronghold on Piram Island near Ghogha on the Gulf of Khambhat, and then, landing his forces, after a stubborn conflict, defeated the Gohils, killing Mokhadaji and capturing Ghogha. Afterwards Muhammad bin Tughluq left for Daulatabad in the Deccan, and in his absence the chiefs and nobles under Malik Túghán, a leader of the Amírán-i Sada, again rebelled, and, obtaining possession of Patan, imprisoned Muîzz-ud-dín the viceroy. The insurgents then plundered Cambay, and afterwards laid siege to Bharuch. Muhammad Tughlak at once marched for Gujarát and relieved Bharuch, Malik Túghán retreating to Cambay, whither he was followed by Malik Yúsuf, whom the emperor sent in pursuit of him. In the battle that ensued near Cambay, Malik Yúsuf was defeated and slain, and all the prisoners, both of this engagement and those who had been previously captured, were put to death by Malik Túghán. Among the prisoners was Muîzz-ud-dín, the governor of Gujarát. Muhammad Tughluq now marched to Cambay in person, hence Malik Túghán retreated to Pátan, pursued by the emperor, who was forced by stress of weather to halt at Asáwal (now Ahmedabad). Eventually the emperor came up with Malik Túghán near Kadi and gained a complete victory, Malik Túghán fleeing to Thatta in Sindh.

==== Subdues Girnár and Kutch, 1350 ====
To establish order throughout Gujarát, Muhammad bin Tughluq marched against Girnar, reduced the fortress, and levied tribute from the it Chudasama chief Khengara. He then went to Kutch, and after subduing that country returned to Sorath. At Gondal, he contracted a fever, and before he was entirely recovered, he advanced through Kutch into Sindh with the view of subduing the Sumra chief of Thatta, who had sheltered Malik Túghán. Before reaching Thatta he succumbed to the fever, and died in the spring of 1351. Shortly before his death, he appointed Nizám-ul-Mulk to the government of Gujarát.

In 1351, Firuz Shah Tughlaq succeeded Muhammad bin Tughluq on the throne of Dehli. Shortly after his accession the emperor marched to Sindh and sent a force against Malik Túghán. About 1360 he again advanced to Sindh against Jám Bábunia. From Sindh he proceeded to Gujarát, where he stayed for some months.

=== Zafar Khan, 1371 and successors ===
Next year, on leaving for Sindh for the third time, Firuz Shah Tughlaq bestowed the government of Gujarát on Zafar Khán in place of Nizám-ul-Mulk. On Zafar Khán’s death, in 1373 according to Farishtah and 1371 according to the Mirăt-i-Áhmedi, he was succeeded by his son Daryá Khán who appears to have governed by a deputy named Shams-ud-dín Anwar Khán. In 1376, besides presents of elephants horses and other valuables, one Shams-ud-dín Dámghání offered a considerable advance on the usual collections from Gujarát. As Daryá Khán would not agree to pay this sum he was displaced and Shams-ud-dín Dámghání was appointed governor. Finding himself unable to pay the stipulated amount this officer rebelled and withheld the revenue. Firuz Shah Tughlaq sent an army against him, and by the aid of the chieftains and people, whom he had greatly oppressed, Shams-ud-dín was slain. The government of the province was then entrusted to Malik Mufarrah Sultani.

=== Farhat-ul-Mulk, 1376–1391 ===
In about 1388, a noble named Sikandar Khán was sent to supersede Malik Mufarrah Sultani known as Farhat-ul-Mulk also Rasti Khan, but was defeated and slain by him. As the emperor Firuz Shah Tughluq died shortly after no notice was taken of Farhat-ul-Mulk’s conduct and in the short reign of Fírúz’s successor Ghiás-ud-dín Tughluq, no change was made in the government of Gujarát. During the brief rule of Abu Bakr Shah, Farhat-ul-Mulk continued undisturbed. But in 1391, on the accession of Násir-ud-dín Muhammad Tughluq II, a noble of the name of Zafar Khán was appointed governor of Gujarát, and despatched with an army to recall or, if necessary, expel Farhat-ul-Mulk.

=== Zafar Khán, 1391–1403 ===
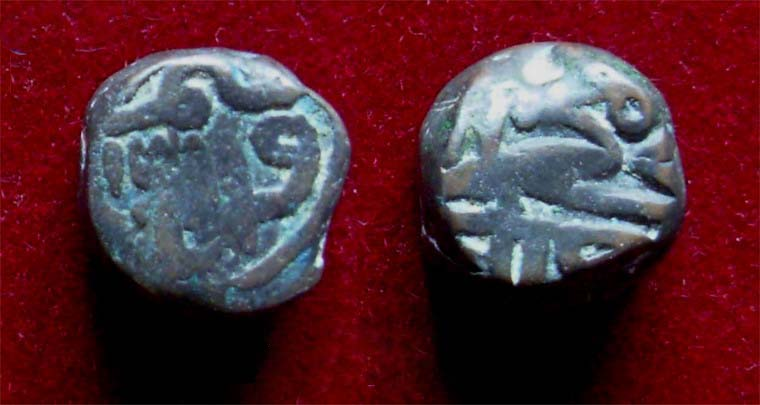
Copper coin of Muzaffar Shah.

In 1391, Sultan Nasir ud din Muhammad Shah III appointed Zafar Khan, the son of Wajih-ul-Mulk as governor of Gujarat and conferred him the title of Muzaffar Khan. In passing Nagor he was met by a deputation from Cambay, complaining of the tyranny of Rásti Khán. Consoling them, he proceeded to Pátan, the seat of government, and then marched against Rásti Khán. The armies met near the village of Kamboi, a dependency of Pátan. Farhat-ul-Mulk Rásti Khán was slain and his army defeated at the battle of Kamboi. To commemorate the victory, Zafar Khán founded a village on the battle-field, which he named Jítpur (the city of victory), and then, starting for Cambay, redressed the grievances of the people. It was rumoured that Farhat-ul-Mulk was trying to establish independent rule in Gujarat. In 1392, Farhat-ul-Mulk was defeated and killed in the battle of Khambhoi or Kambhor (now Gambhu), near Anhilwada Patan and occupied the city of Anhilwada Patan. He founded Jitpur at the site of victory.

On the death of Nasir ud din Muhammad Shah III in 1392, his son Sikandar assumed the throne but he died just after 45 days. He was succeeded by his brother Nasir-ud-Din Mahmud Shah Tughluq II but his cousin Nusrat Khan also claimed similar rank in Firuzabad.

Zafar Khán’s first warlike expedition was against the Rao of Idar, who, in 1393, had refused to pay the customary tribute, and this chief he humbled. The contemporary histories seem to show that the previous governors had recovered tribute from all or most of the chiefs of Gujarát except from the Ráo of Junagadh and the Rája of Rajpipla, who had retained their independence. Zafar Khán now planned an expedition against the celebrated Somnath Temple, but, hearing that Ádil Khán of Ásír-Burhánpur had invaded Sultánpur and Nandurbar, he moved his troops in that direction, and Ádil Khán retired to Ásir.

In 1394, he marched against the Ráo of Junágaḍh named Mokalasimha and exacted tribute. Afterwards, proceeding to Somnath, he destroyed the temple, built an Jumma Mosque, introduced Islám, left Muslim law officers, and established a thána or post in the city of Somnáth Pátan or Deva Pátan. He heard that the Hindus of Mandu were oppressing the Muslims, and, accordingly, marching there, he beleaguered that fortress for a year, but failing to take it contented himself with accepting the excuses of the Rája. From Mándu he performed a pilgrimage to Ajmer. Here he proceeded against the chiefs of Sambhar and Dandwana, and then attacking the Rájputs of Delváḍa and Jháláváḍa, (Note: Identification of Delváḍa and Jháláváḍa are somewhat difficult. The context suggests either Jalore in Rajasthan or Jháláváḍa in the extreme south-east of Rajasthan, south of Kota. The combination Delváḍa and Jháláváḍa seems to favour Saurashtra region of Gujarat since there is a Delvada in the south of the Saurashtra near Diu and a Jháláváḍa in the north-east. But the Delváda of the text can hardly be near Diu. It apparently is Delváda near Eklingji about twenty miles north of Udaipur. The account of Ahmad Shah I’s expedition to the same place in 1431 confirms this identification.) he defeated them, and returned to Pátan in 1396.

About this time his son Tátár Khán, leaving his baggage in the fort of Panipat, made an attempt on Delhi. But Iqbál Khán took the fort of Pánipat, captured Tátár Khán’s baggage, and forced him to withdraw to Gujarát. In 1397, with the view of reducing Ídar, Zafar Khán besieged the fort, laying waste the neighbouring country.

In prevailing situation, Timur invaded India and marched on Delhi in 1398. In early 1399, he defeated Mahmud II and looted and destroyed the much of Delhi. Sultan Mahmud II escaped and after many wanderings, reached Patan. He hoped to secure Zafar Khan's alliance to march to Delhi but Zafar Khan declined. He went to Malwa where he was declined again by local governor. Meanwhile, his Wazir Iqbal Khan had expelled Nusrat Khan from Delhi so he returned to Delhi but he had no longer enough authority over provinces which were ruled independently by his governors.

Before Zafar Khan had taken the Idar fort Zafar Khán received news of Timur's conquest of Delhi, and concluding a peace with the Ídar king, returned to Pátan. In 1398, hearing that the Somnáth people claimed independence, Zafar Khán led an army against them, defeated them, and established Islám on a firm footing.

In 1403, Zafar Khan's son Tatar Khan urged his father to march on Delhi, which he declined. As a result, in 1403, Tatar imprisoned him in Ashawal (future Ahmedabad) and declared himself sultan under the title of Muhammad Shah. He humbled the chief of Nandod in Rajpipla. He marched towards Delhi, but on the way he was poisoned by his uncle, Shams Khán Dandáni at Sinor on the north bank of Narmada River. Some sources says he died naturally due to weather or due to his habit of heavy drinking. After the death of Muhammad Shah, Zafar was released from the prison in 1404. Zafar Khán asked his own younger brother Shams Khán Dandáni to carry on the government, but he refused. Zafar Khán accordingly sent Shams Khán Dandáni to Nágor in place of Jalál Khán Khokhar. Zafar took over the control over administration. In 1407, he declared himself as Sultan Muzaffar Shah I at Birpur or Sherpur, took the insignia of royalty and issued coins in his name. Thus he formally established Gujarat Sultanate.

== Architecture ==
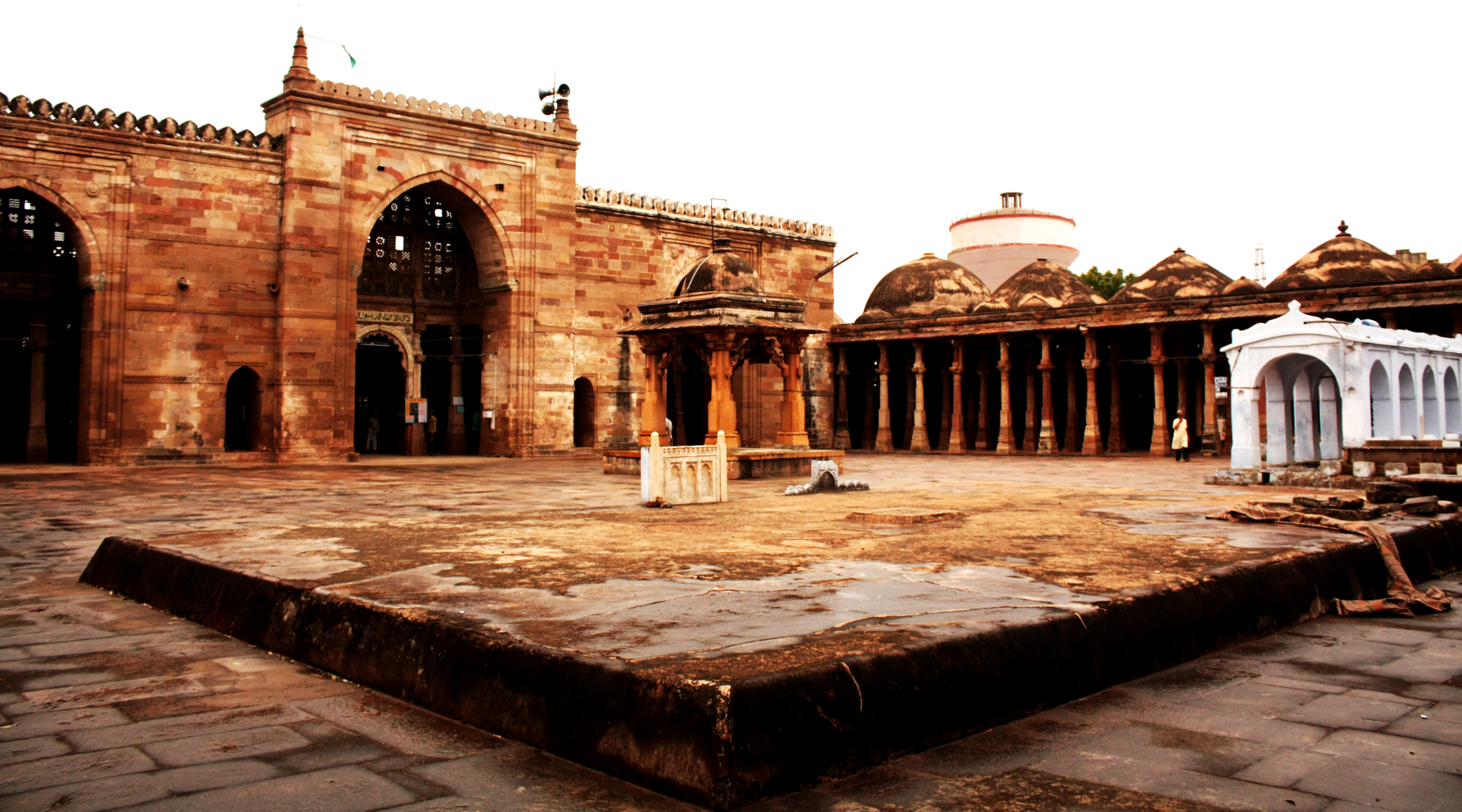
Jami Masjid in Khambhat, built in 1325 during Tughluq rule, marks the start of Islamic architecture in Gujarat.

The construction during this period continued earlier local architecture tradition which has reached in its pinnacle as Maru-Gurjara Architecture. The tradition continued in temples, mosques, residents and civic structures. The local tradition was modified and expanded to suit Islamic believes, rituals and practices. The construction of Islamic ritual buildings such as mosques were codified and standardised. Such codification is found in 15th century Sanskrit treatise, Rahmana-Prasada. One such early example of mosque include the Jami Mosque in Mangrol built in 1383-84.

The notable mosques built during this period include Mosque of Al-Iraji at Junagadh (1286–87), Rahimat Mosque in Mangrol (1382–1383), Jami Mosque of Bharuch (1321), Jami mosque of Khambhat, Bahlol Khan Gazi or Hilal Khan Kazi Mosque (1333) and Tanka Mosque (1361) in Dholka. The tomb of Al-Khazeruni in Khambhat was built in 1333.

=== Stepwells ===
The Madhavav in Wadhwan was built in 1294 (Vikram Samvat 1350) by Nagar Brahmin Madha and Keshav, the ministers in court of the last Vaghela ruler Karna. The Batris Kotha stepwell in Kapadvanj may have belonged to the 13th century due to its similarity with the Madha and Vikia stepwells.

A large number of stepwells were constructed in the 14th century. Sodhali stepwell in Mangrol was built in 1319 (V. S. 1375) by Vali Sodhala of Modha caste. The stepwell near the Brahma temple of Khedbrahma belonged to the 14th century judged by its style. The Suda stepwell in Mahuva (1381), Hani stepwell in Dhandhusar (1389/1333 AD) and Siddhnath Mahadev stepwell in Dholka were built during Tughluq rule in Gujarat. The stepwell of Sampa near Ahmedabad was built in 1328.

== List of governors under the Delhi Sultanate (1297–1407) ==
=== Governors under Khalji dynasty ===
- Ulugh Khan
- Alp Khan (c. 1310–1315)
- Kamal al-Din Gurg (d. 1315–1316)
- Ain-ul-Mulk Multani (1318)
- Zafar Khán
- Hisám-ud-dín Parmár
- Malik Wájid-ud-dín Kuraishi (aka Táj-ul-Mulk)
- Khusraw Khán Parmár

=== Governors under Tughluq dynasty ===
Ghiás-ud-dín Tughluq, Emperor

- Táj-ul-Mulk, Governor, 1320 (2nd time)

Muhammad Tughluq Emperor, (1325–1351)

- Malik Mukbil (Khán Jahán and Náib-i-Mukhtár)
- Áhmad Ayáz (Khwájah Jahán) (?–1338)
- Malik Mukbil (1338–?) (2nd time)
- Nizám-ul-Mulk

Fírúz Tughluq, Emperor, (1351–1388)

- Zafar Khan, Governor, 1371
- Daryá Khán
- Shams-ud-dín Dámghání
- Farhat-ul-Mulk Rásti Khán, Governor, 1376–1391
- Sikandar Khán (killed)

Muhammad Tughluq II, Emperor, 1391–1393

- Zafar Khán, 1391–1403

== Bibliography ==
- Taylor, Georg P. (1902). The Coins Of The Gujarat Saltanat. Vol. XXI. Mumbai: Royal Asiatic Society of Bombay. hdl:2015/104269. Archived from the original on 1 March 2017. This article incorporates text from this source, which is in the public domain.
- Nayak, Chhotubhai Ranchhodji (1982). ગુજરાતમાંની ઇસ્લામી સલ્તનતનો ઈતિહાસ (ઇ.સ. ૧૩૦૦થી ઇ.સ.૧૫૭૩ સુધી) [History of Islamic Sultanate in Gujarat] (in Gujarati). Ahmedabad: Gujarat University.
- Campbell, James Macnabb (1896). "Chapter I. Early Musalmán Governors.(A.D. 1297–1403.) and II. ÁHMEDÁBÁD KINGS. (A. D. 1403–1573.)". In James Macnabb Campbell (ed.). History of Gujarát. Gazetteer of the Bombay Presidency. Vol. I(II). The Government Central Press. pp. 230–236. This article incorporates text from this source, which is in the public domain.
- Patel, Alka (2004). Building Communities in Gujarāt: Architecture and Society During the Twelfth Through Fourteenth Centuries. BRILL. pp. xi–xvi, 3–20. ISBN 90-04-13890-0.
- Jutta Jain-Neubauer (1981). The Stepwells of Gujarat: In Art-historical Perspective. Abhinav Publications. pp. 19–24. ISBN 978-0-391-02284-3.
- Iqtidar Alam Khan (2008). Historical Dictionary of Medieval India. Scarecrow. ISBN 9780810864016.
- John Cort (2010). Framing the Jina: Narratives of Icons and Idols in Jain History. Oxford University Press. ISBN 978-0-19-045257-5.
- Banarsi Prasad Saksena (1992). "The Khaljis: Alauddin Khalji". In Mohammad Habib and Khaliq Ahmad Nizami (ed.). A Comprehensive History of India: The Delhi Sultanat (A.D. 1206-1526). Vol. 5 (Second ed.). The Indian History Congress / People's Publishing House. OCLC 31870180.
- Edward Clive Bayley (1886). The Local Muhammadan Dynasties - Gujarát. The History of India as Told by Its Own Historians. W.H. Allen and Co.
- Peter Jackson (2003). The Delhi Sultanate: A Political and Military History. Cambridge University Press. ISBN 978-0-521-54329-3.
