= Muzaffar Shah I =

Sultan of Gujarat from 1407 to 1411

- Sultan
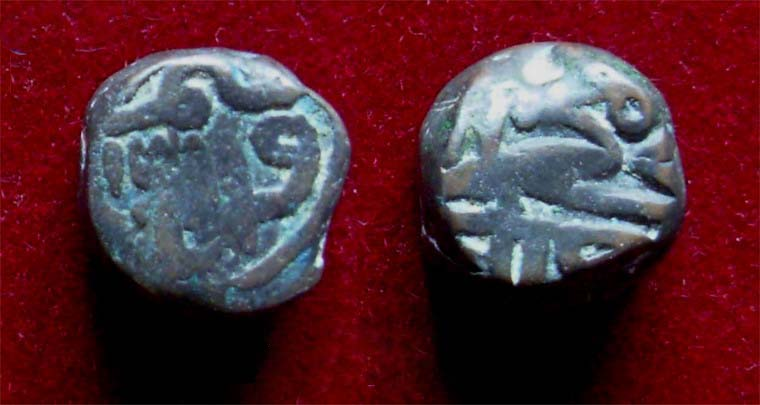
- Copper coin of Muzaffar Shah

Sultan of Gujarat
- Reign: 1394 – 28 July 1410
- Predecessor: Position established (Himself as the Governor of Gujarat)
- Successor: Ahmad Shah I

Sultan of Malwa
- Reign: 1407 – December 1408
- Predecessor: Hoshang Shah
- Successor: Musa Khan (in Mandu); Hoshang Shah (in Dhar)
- Governor: Nusrat Khan

Governor of Gujarat
- Reign: 8 February 1391 – December 1403
- Predecessor: Malik Mufarrah Sultani
- Successor: Muhammad Shah I
- Reign: March 1404 – 1407
- Predecessor: Muhammad Shah I
- Successor: Position abolished (Himself as the Sultan of Gujarat)
- Born: 30 June 1342
- Died: 10 January 1411 (aged 68); Anhilwada Patan, Gujarat (modern-day Gujarat, India)
- Burial: 1411; Anhilwada Patan
- Issue: Muhammad Shah I Firuz Khan; Masti Khan; Haibat Khan; Fath Khan; Mahtab Khan
- Dynasty: Muzaffarid
- Father: Wajih-ul-Mulk
- Religion: Islam
- Military career
- Service years: c. 1392–1411
- Conflicts: Battle of Kamboi (1392); Invasion of Malwa (1407)

Shams-ud-Din Muzaffar Shah I (born Zafar Khan; 30 June 1342 – 10 January 1411) was the founder of the Muzaffarid dynasty of Gujarat Sultanate in medieval India, ruling from 1391 to 1403 and again from 1404 to 1411, assuming the title Sultan Muzaffar Shah.

He was initially appointed the governor of Gujarat by Tughlaq dynasty of the Delhi Sultanate and later declared the independence following the chaos at Delhi when Timur sacked the capital in 1398. Muzaffar was deposed by his ambitious son Tatar Khan in 1403, but he regained the throne in 1404, when Tatar Khan died.

== Early life ==
Zafar Khan was born on Muharram 25, 743 A.H. corresponding to 30 June 1342 AD. Zafar Khan was a son of Wajih-ul-Mulk. According to Mirʾāt-i-Sikandarī, saint Jahaniyan Jahangasht promised Gujarat to Zafar Khan prophetically, in return of food provided to fakirs at his house. He gave him a handful of dates and declared, "Thy seed like unto these in number shall rule over Gujarat". The number of seeds varied from eleven to thirteen according to various sources.

Muhammad bin Tughlaq was on an expedition to intervene in a war but died at Thatta on the bank of the Indus River in 1351 from fever induced by a surfeit of fish. As he had no sons, his cousin Firuz Shah Tughlaq succeeded. Zafar's paternal aunt, a Kalal girl was also married in Tughlaq family.

Firuz Shah Tughluq appointed Malik Mufarrah Sultani, also known as Farhat-ul-Mulk Rasti Khan governor of Gujarat in 1377. In 1387, Sikandar Khan was sent to replace him, but he was defeated and killed by Farhat-ul-Mulk. Firuz Shah died in 1388 and his great-grandson, Ghiyas-ud-Din Tughlaq II succeeded but was reign only for five months. He was succeeded by another grandson Abu Bakr Shah but after nine months he was deposed by Firuz Shah's son, Nasir ud din Muhammad Shah III who ruled for three years 1389–1392.

== Tughluq governor of Gujarat (1391–1407) ==
In 1391, Sultan Nasir ud-Din Muhammad Shah III appointed Zafar Khan, the son of Wajih-ul-Mulk as governor of Gujarat and conferred him the title of Muzaffar Khan. In passing Nagor he was met by a deputation from Cambay, complaining of the tyranny of Rásti Khán. Consoling them, he proceeded to Pátan, the seat of government, and then marched against Rásti Khán. The armies met near the village of Kamboi, a dependency of Pátan. Farhat-ul-Mulk was slain and his army defeated at the battle of Kamboi. To commemorate the victory, Zafar Khán founded a village on the battle-field, which he named Jítpur (the city of victory), and then, starting for Cambay, redressed the grievances of the people. It was rumoured that Farhat-ul-Mulk was trying to establish independent rule in Gujarat. In 1392, Farhat-ul-Mulk was defeated and killed in the battle of Kambor (now Gambhu), near Anhilwada Patan and occupied the city of Anhilwada Patan. He founded Jitpur at the site of victory.

On the death of Nasir ud din Muhammad Shah III in 1392, his son Sikandar assumed the throne but he died just after 45 days. He was succeeded by his brother Nasir-ud-Din Mahmud Shah Tughluq II but his cousin Nusrat Khan also claimed similar rank in Firuzabad.

Zafar Khán's first warlike expedition was against the Rao of Idar, who, in 1393, had refused to pay the customary tribute, and this chief he humbled. The contemporary histories seem to show that the previous governors had recovered tribute from all or most of the chiefs of Gujarát except from the Ráo of Junagadh and the Rája of Rajpipla, who had retained their independence. Zafar Khán now planned an expedition against the celebrated Somnath temple, but, hearing that Ádil Khán of Ásír-Burhánpur had invaded Sultánpur and Nandurbar, he moved his troops in that direction, and Ádil Khán retired to Ásir.

In 1394, he marched against the Ráo of Junágaḍh and exacted tribute. Afterwards, proceeding to Somnath, he destroyed the temple, built an Jumma Mosque, introduced Islám, left Muslim law officers, and established a thána or post in the city of Somnáth Pátan or Deva Pátan. He heard that the Hindus of Mandu were oppressing the Muslims, and, accordingly, marching there, he beleaguered that fortress for a year, but failing to take it contented himself with accepting the excuses of the Rája. From Mándu he performed a pilgrimage to Ajmer. Here he proceeded against the chiefs of Sambhar and Dandwana, and then attacking the Rájputs of Delváḍa and Jháláváḍa, (Note: Identification of Delváḍa and Jháláváḍa are somewhat difficult. The context suggests either Jalore in Rajasthan or Jháláváḍa in the extreme south-east of Rajasthan, south of Kota. The combination Delváḍa and Jháláváḍa seems to favour Saurashtra region of Gujarat since there is a Delvada in the south of the Saurashtra near Diu and a Jháláváḍa in the north-east. But the Delváda of the text can hardly be near Diu. It apparently is Delváda near Eklingji about twenty miles north of Udaipur. The account of Ahmad Shah I's expedition to the same place in 1431 confirms this identification.) he defeated them, and returned to Pátan in 1396.

About this time his son Tátár Khán, leaving his baggage in the fort of Panipat, made an attempt on Delhi. But Iqbál Khán took the fort of Pánipat, captured Tátár Khán's baggage, and forced him to withdraw to Gujarát. In 1397, with the view of reducing Ídar, Zafar Khán besieged the fort, laying waste the neighbouring country.

In prevailing situation, Timur invaded India and marched on Delhi in 1398. In early 1399, he defeated Mahmud II and looted and destroyed the much of Delhi. Sultan Mahmud II escaped and after many wanderings, reached Patan. He hoped to secure Zafar Khan's alliance to march to Delhi but Zafar Khan declined. He went to Malwa where he was declined again by local governor. Meanwhile, his Wazir Iqbal Khan had expelled Nusrat Khan from Delhi so he returned to Delhi but he had no longer enough authority over provinces which were ruled independently by his governors.

Before Zafar Khan had taken the Idar fort Zafar Khán received news of Timur's conquest of Delhi, and concluding a peace with the Ídar king, returned to Pátan. In 1398, hearing that the Somnáth people claimed independence, Zafar Khán led an army against them, defeated them, and established Islám on a firm footing.

In 1403, Zafar Khan's son Tatar Khan urged his father to march on Delhi, which he declined. As a result, in 1403, Tatar imprisoned him in Ashawal (future Ahmedabad) and declared himself sultan under the title of Muhammad Shah. He humbled the chief of Nandod in Rajpipla. He marched towards Delhi, but on the way he was poisoned by his uncle, Shams Khán Dandáni at Sinor on the north bank of the Narmada river. Some sources says he died naturally due to weather or due to his habit of heavy drinking. After the death of Muhammad Shah, Zafar was released from the prison in 1404. Zafar Khán asked his own younger brother Shams Khán Dandáni to carry on the government, but he refused. Zafar Khán accordingly sent Shams Khán Dandáni to Nágor in place of Jalál Khán Khokhar. Zafar took over the control over administration. In 1407, he declared himself as Sultan Muzaffar Shah at Birpur or Sherpur, took the insignia of royalty and issued coins in his name.

== Sultan of Gujarat (1407–1411) ==
=== Invasion of Malwa Sultanate ===
In 1406, Ap Khán, son of Dilawar Khan of the Malwa Sultanate, was rumoured to have poisoned his father and ascended the throne with the title of Sultan Hushang Shah. On hearing this Muzaffar Sháh marched against Hushang and besieged him in Dhar. He had successful expedition against Dhar which came under his control.

Muzaffar handed Hushang to the charge of his brother Shams Khan, on whom he conferred the title of Nasrat Khan. Hushang remained a year in confinement, and Musa Khan one of his relations usurped his authority. On hearing this, Hushang begged to be released, and Muzaffar Shah not only agreed to his prayer, but sent his grandson Ahmed Khan later Ahmad Shah I with an army to reinstate him. This expedition was successful; the fortress of Mandu was taken, and the usurper Musa Khan was put to flight. Ahmed Khan returned to Gujarat in 1409–10 AD. Meanwhile, Muzaffar advancing towards Delhi to aid Nasir-ud-Din Mahmud Shah Tughluq, prevented an intended attack on that city by Sultan Ibrahim of Jaunpur.

He had suppressed a rebellion or sent an unsuccessful expedition to Kanthkot in Kutch. According to Mirat-i-Ahmadi, he abdicated the throne in favour of his grandson Ahmad Shah I in 1410 due to his failing health. He died five months and 13 days later. According to Mirat-i-Sikandari, Ahmad Shah was going to an expedition to quell the rebellion of Kolis of Ashawal. After leaving Patan, he convened an assembly of Ulemas and asked a question that should he took retribution his father's unjust death. Ulemas replied in favour and he got the written answers. He returned to Patan and forced his grandfather Muzaffar Shah to drink poison which killed him. He was buried in Patan. Ahmad Shah I succeeded him at the age of 19 in 1411.

Two younger sons of Muzaffar, Firuz Khan and Haibat Khan had rebelled against their nephew with the assistance of Hushang Shah of Malwa, but were defeated. Another son of Muzaffar, Fath Khan, went to Delhi and served as a general under Mubarak Shah of Delhi Sultanate, eventually gaining the title of Khan-i-Azam. One son of Sultan Muzaffar, Mahtab Khan, served in the army of his great-grandnephew, Ahmad Shah II in the Battle of Kapadvanj during Mahmud Khalji's invasion of Gujarat.
