= Battle of Kamboi =

1392 battle in Gujarat

Date	4 January 1392
Location	Kamboi, Chanasama Taluka, Patan district 23°40′23.25″N 72°1′9.74″E
Result	Delhi Sultanate victory
Territorial changes	Delhi Sultanate re-established its authority over Gujarat

Belligerents
Delhi Sultanate	Gujarat governorate

Commanders and leaders
Muzaffar Shah I	Malik Mufarrah Sultani †

Strength
4,000 cavalry	10,000–12,000

Casualties and losses
Unknown	Unknown
- Location within Gujarat Battle of Kamboi (India)

The Battle of Kamboi or Battle of Jitpur was a decisive engagement fought on 4 January 1392 between the forces of Muzaffar Khan, the newly appointed governor of Gujarat, and the rebellious governor Malik Mufarrah Sultani at the village of Kamboi where Muzaffar Khan’s forces defeated and killed Malik Mufarrah Sultani.

Malik Mufarrah Sultani titled Farhat-ul-Mulk and Rasti Khan, had been governing Gujarat since 1382 but refused to relinquish power after being replaced in 1387. Following the death of Firuz Shah Tughlaq in 1388, he increasingly acted independently, forming alliances with local Hindu Rajput chiefs and adopting policies that alarmed the province’s Muslim leaders. In response, the Delhi Sultanate appointed Muzaffar Khan in 1391 to restore imperial authority. The battle restored Delhi's authority over Gujarat and paved the way toward the establishment of the independent Muzaffarid dynasty of the Gujarat Sultanate.

== Background ==
In 1382, Firuz Shah Tughlaq appointed Malik Mufarrah Sultani titled Farhat-ul-Mulk and Rasti Khan as governor of Gujarat. He was replaced in 1387 by Malik Yaqub titled Sikandar Khan. Farhat-ul-Mulk refused to relinquish power and killed him in battle. After Firuz Shah’s death in 1388, Farhat-ul-Mulk began moving toward independence. In 1391, Muhammad Shah III learned that he had formed alliances with local Hindu Rajput chiefs, encouraged Hindu idol worship, and permitted the repair of the Somnath temple while neglecting Islamic practices. These policies alarmed Gujarat’s ulama and Muslim leaders, who petitioned Delhi for intervention. In response, Muzaffar Khan was appointed governor of Gujarat on 21 February 1391. He arrived at Nagaur first. On his way to assume charge of his government in Gujarat, he received numerous complaints from the inhabitants of Cambay and other towns. These grievances were directed against the oppressive rule of Farhat-ul-Mulk, whose heavy taxes and arbitrary imposts had become a heavy burden on the people.

== Battle ==
Muzaffar Khan reached the vicinity of Patan. There he wrote to Farhat-ul-Mulk, advising him to proceed to the royal court and remit the large balance of revenue that had long been withheld from the crown. However, Farhat-ul-Mulk ignored the orders. Instead, he remained at his capital, Patan and assembled an army of over 10,000 to 12,000 troops mostly composed of Hindu soldiers to resist the newly appointed governor. By this time, Muzaffar Khan had advanced to the old town of Asawal on the banks of the Sabarmati River. From there, he once again warned Farhat-ul-Mulk against defying lawful authority saying his acts would brand him a rebel. In reply, Farhat-ul-Mulk sent an insolent answer. Determined to enforce his commission, Muzaffar Khan raised a force of about 4,000 cavalry and marched rapidly towards Patan. The two armies clashed at the village of Kamboi. On 4 January 1392 both armies fought. Farhat-ul-Mulk gained the upper hand in the beginning. The trajectory of the battle was soon turned to the imperial side. Farhat-ul-Mulk was decisively defeated and slain. His body was identified in the slain soldiers on the battlefield.

== Aftermath ==
Following his victory at the battle of Kamboi, Muzaffar Khan marched to Patan and took control of the province. To commemorate his triumph, he ordered the foundation of a new town on the actual battlefield, which he named Jitpur meaning ‘the Town of Victory’. This victory marked the beginning of rule of the Muzaffarids who soon founded the independent Gujarat Sultanate.

== See also ==
- Battle of Sanjan
- Battle of Kapadvanj
- Battle of Diu
- Battle of Bharuch

== Bibliography ==
- Commissariat, M. S. (1938). A History of Gujarat. Vol. I. Ahmadabad: Longmans Green & Co. Ltd.
- Chaube, J. (1975). History of Gujarat Kingdom, 1458-1537. Munshiram Manoharlal Publishers. ISBN 978-0-88386-573-6.
- Misra, Satish Chandra (1995). Rise of Muslim Power in Gujarat: History of Gujarat 1298-1442. Munshiram Manoharlal Publishers Pvt. Limited. ISBN 978-81-215-0169-9.
