= Malik Mufarrah Sultani =

Delhi Sultanate governor of Gujarat from 1377 to 1391

Governor of Gujarat

Farhat-ul-Mulk Rasti Khan
- In office 1382–1391
- Preceded by: Shams-ud-din Damghani
- Succeeded by: Malik Yaqub; Muzaffar Shah I

Personal details
- Died: 4 January 1392 Kamboi
- Resting place: Kamboi
- Occupation: Naib (Governor)

Military service
- Allegiance: Delhi Sultanate
- Battles/wars: Battle of Kamboi †

Malik Mufarrah Sultani (Persian: مالک مفرح سلطانی; died 4 January 1392), known by his titles Farhat-ul-Mulk and Rasti Khan, was a Tughlaq-era noble. He the last governor of Gujarat serving ten years from 1382 to 1391. Appointed by Sultan Firuz Shah Tughlaq, he initially consolidated control over the province. After the downfall of Delhi Sultanate's authority he attempted to assert independence. He formed alliances with local Hindu Rajput rajas, encouraging idol worshiping and relaxed Muslim observances. In 1391, Sultan Muhammad Shah III appointed Zafar Khan (later Muzaffar Shah I) as the new governor. He decisively defeated and killed Farhat-ul-Mulk at the Battle of Kamboi on 4 January 1392.

== Early career ==
The inscriptions of the Jami masjid of Dholka dated AH 962/1360-61 AD writes Mufarrah-u'l-khawas Khas-u'l-khas Sultani and Banda-i-Firuz Shah. These inscriptions are dated the time when Malik Mufarrah would have been appointed to Dholkah.

== Governor of Gujarat ==
In 1374–75 AD, Firuz Shah Tughlaq appointed Shams-ud-din Damghani as Governor (naib) of Gujarat after he promised the Emperor to send an extra payment above the existing revenue. Damghani failed because of his unrealistic promises were impossible to fulfill, forcing him to brutally oppress the local population. At last, he ceased paying to Delhi before declaring open revolt. The oppressed people of Gujarat and the Amiran-i-sadah rose up against his tyranny killing him in battle in 1380–81. After which his head was severed and sent to Delhi. After Damghani's fall Firuz Shah appointed Malik Mufarrah Sultani known by his titles Farhat-ul-Mulk and Rasti Khan in 1382. He asserted his control over the province. In 1387, he was replaced by Malik Yaqub titled Sikandar Khan. Farhat-ul-Mulk refusing to comply the orders killed Malik Yaqub in battle. In the following year 1388, Firuz Shah Tughlaq died. In 1391, Muhammad Shah III received intelligence reports that Farhat-ul-Mulk had been trying to assume independence. He formed alliance with the local Hindu Rajput encouraging Hindu idol worship to gain popularity. He permitted the Hindus to repair the Somnath temple but let go the Muslim practices go unobserved. His policies were perceived 'danger to Islam' by Gujarat's ulamas and religious Muslim leaders who sent to petition Delhi. The Sultan dispatched Zafar Khan to Patan bestowing the title Muzaffar Khan.

== Death ==
Muzaffar Khan left Delhi on 21 February 1391 and arrived at Nagaur. He dispatched letters to Farhat-ul-Mulk to surrender. But Farhat-ul-Mulk raised an army composed of Hindu Rajputs to check the newly appointed governor. On 4 January 1392, the battle of Kamboi was fought at Kamboi. Muzaffar Khan decisively defeated and killed the incumbent governor Farhat-ul-Mulk. Malik Mufarrah Sultani had a son named Alauddin Ali, who died young in 1366 and was buried at Rajpuri.

== Bibliography ==
- Commissariat, M. S. (1938). A History of Gujarat. Vol. I. Ahmadabad: Longmans Green & Co. Ltd.
- Chaube, J. (1975). History of Gujarat Kingdom, 1458-1537. Munshiram Manoharlal Publishers. ISBN 978-0-88386-573-6.
- Misra, Satish Chandra (1995). Rise of Muslim Power in Gujarat: History of Gujarat 1298-1442. Munshiram Manoharlal Publishers Pvt. Limited. ISBN 978-81-215-0169-9.
