= Muhammad Shah I =

Sultan of Gujarat from 1403 to 1404

- Sultan of Muzaffarids

2nd Sultan of Gujarat
- Reign: 1403 - 1404
- Predecessor: Muzaffar Shah I
- Successor: Muzaffar Shah I
- Died: 1404
- Issue: Ahmad Shah I Latif Khan
- Dynasty: Muzaffarid
- Father: Muzaffar Shah I
- Religion: Islam

Muhammad Shah I, born Tatar Khan, was a ruler of the Muzaffarid dynasty, who reigned over the Gujarat Sultanate briefly from 1403 (when he deposed his father, Zafar Khan), until 1404, when Zafar Khan regained the throne.

== Early life ==
About 1396, Tatar Khan, leaving his baggage in the fort of Panipat, made an attempt to capture Delhi. But Iqbál Khán took the fort of Pánipat, captured Tátár Khán's baggage, and forced him to withdraw to Gujarát.

On the death of Nasir ud din Muhammad Shah III in 1392, Nasir's son Sikandar assumed the throne but died after just after 45 days. Sikandar was succeeded by his brother Mahmud II but their cousin Nusrat Khan also claimed similar rank in Firuzabad. In the prevailing situation, Tamerlane invaded India and marched on Delhi in 1398. In early 1399, Tamerlane defeated Mahmud II and looted and destroyed much of Delhi. Sultan Mahmud II escaped and after many wanderings, reached Patan. Mahmud II hoped to secure Zafar Khan's alliance to march to Delhi but Zafar Khan declined. Mahmud II went to Malwa, where he was declined again by local governor. Meanwhile, Mahmud II's son Wazir Iqbal Khan had expelled Nusrat Khan from Delhi. Mahmud returned to Delhi, but no longer enough authority over provinces, which were ruled independently by his governors.

== Reign ==
In 1403, Zafar Khan's son Tatar Khan urged his father to march on Delhi to take advantage of the situation, but Zafar declined. As a result, in 1403, Tatar imprisoned Zafar in Ashaval (now Ahmedabad) and declared himself Sultan of Gujarat, reigning as Muhammad Shah I. Tatar humbled the chief of Nandod in Rajpipla, and marched towards Delhi. On the way, Tatar was poisoned by his uncle, Shams Khán Dandáni, at Sinor on the north bank of Narmada River. Some sources says he died naturally due to weather or due to his habit of heavy drinking. After the death of Tatar, Zafar was released from the prison in 1404. Zafar Khán asked his own younger brother Shams Khán Dandáni to carry on the government, but Shams refused. Zafar took over the control over administration. In 1407, he declared himself as Sultan Muzaffar Shah I at Birpur or Sherpur, took the insignia of royalty and issued coins in his name. Tatar Khan's oldest son, Ahmad Shah I, later ascended the throne of Gujarat following Sultan Muzaffar's death, while his younger son, Latif Khan served as a general of his brother.
