= Darshna Vasava =

Indian politician

Darshna Chandubhai Deshmukh Vasava (born 1968) is an Indian politician from Gujarat. She is a member of the Gujarat Legislative Assembly from Nandod Assembly constituency, which is reserved for Scheduled Tribe community, in Narmada district. She won the 2022 Gujarat Legislative Assembly election representing the Bharatiya Janata Party.

== Early life and education ==
Vasava is from Nandod, Narmada district, Gujarat. She married Chandubhai Deshmukh, who is also a doctor. She completed her MBBS in MBBS in gynaecology and later did MD at Maharaja Sayyajirao University of Baroda, Vadodara in 1998.

== Career ==
Vasava won from Nandod Assembly constituency representing Bharatiya Janata Party in the 2022 Gujarat Legislative Assembly election. She polled 70,543 votes and defeated her nearest rival, Haresh Vasava of the Indian National Congress, by a margin of 28,202 votes.
