= Dvārakā–Kamboja route =

Silk Road trade route branch

- Kamboja–Dvārakā Trade Route

Route information
- Existed: Ancient times–present

Major junctions
- Dvārakā, Gujarat, India end: Seaport of Dvārakā
- Kamboja Tribes, Afghanistan and Tajikistan end: Silk Road to China

Location
- Countries: India, Tajikistan

Highway system

The Dvārakā–Kamboja route is an ancient land trade route that was an important branch of the Silk Road during antiquity and the early medieval era. It is referred to in Buddhist, Hindu, and Jain works. It connected the Kamboja Kingdom in today's Afghanistan and Tajikistan via Pakistan to Dvārakā (Dvaravati) and other major ports in Gujarat, India, permitting goods from Afghanistan and China to be exported by sea to southern India, Sri Lanka, the Middle East and Ancient Greece and Rome. The road was the second most important ancient caravan route linking India with the nations of the northwest.

== The route ==
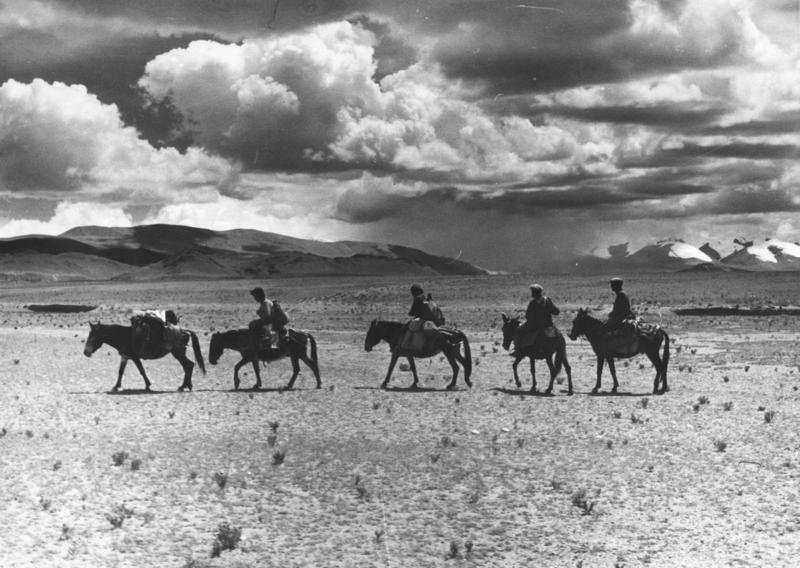
A horse caravan.

The Kamboja–Dvārakā trade route began at the seaport of Dvārakā. It passed through the Anarta region to Madhyamika, a city near Chittor. South of Aravalli, the road reached the Indus River, where it turned north. At Roruka (modern Rodi), the route split in two: one road turned east and followed the river Sarasvati to Hastinapura and Indraprastha, while the second branch continued north to join the main east-west road (the Uttarapatha Route across northern India from Pataliputra to Bamyan) at Pushkalavati.

From Pushkalavati, the Kamboja-Dvārakā and Uttarapatha routes ran together to Bahlika through Kabul and Bamyan. At Bahlika, the road turned east to pass through the Pamir Mountains and Badakshan, finally connecting with the Silk Road to China.

== Land trade ==
Both the historical record and archaeological evidence show that the ancient kingdoms in the northwest (Gandhāra and Kamboja) had economic and political relations with the western Indian kingdoms (Anarta and Saurashtra) since Ancient times. This commercial intercourse appears to have led to the adoption of similar sociopolitical institutions by both the Kambojas and the Saurashtras.

=== Historical records ===
References in both Hindu and Buddhist scriptures mention trading activities of the ancient Kambojas with other nations:

- It is referred to in the Pali work called Petavatthu, wherein it is said that traders went with caravans with wagons loaded with goods from Dvāravati to Kamboja.
- The Arthashastra by Kautiliya, a treatise on statecraft written between the 4th century BCE and the 4th century CE, classifies the Kamboja and Saurashtra kingdoms as one entity, since the same form of politico-economic institutions existed in both republics. The text makes particular mention of warfare, cattle-based agriculture and trade. The description tallies with those in the Bṛhat Saṃhitā, a 6th-century CE encyclopedia and the major epic Mahabharata, which makes particular reference to the wealth of the Kambojas.

=== Archaeological evidence ===
Numerous precious objects discovered in excavations in Afghanistan, at Bamyan and Begram and Pakistan at Taxila, bear evidence to a close trade relationship between the region and ancient Phoenicia and Rome to the west and Sri Lanka to the south.

Because archaeological digs in Gujarat have also found ancient ports, the Kamboja–Dvārakā Route is viewed as the logical corridor for those trade items that reached the sea before traveling on east and west.

== The seaport and international trade ==
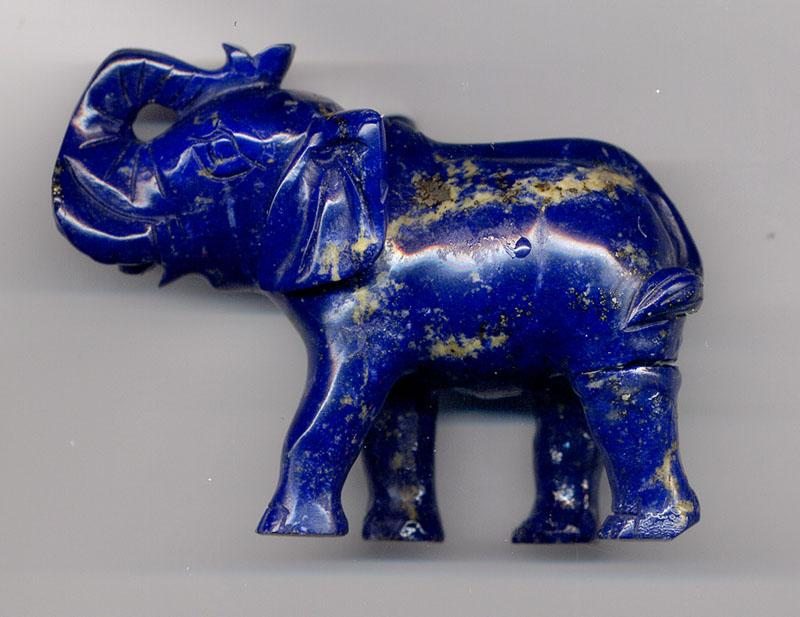
Lapis lazuli.

From the port of Dvārakā at the terminus of the Kamboja–Dvārakā Route, traders connected with sea trading routes to exchange goods as far west as Rome and as far east as Kampuchea. Goods shipped at Dvārakā also reached Greece, Egypt, the Arabian Peninsula, southern India, Sri Lanka, Myanmar, the land of Suwannaphum (whose location has still not been determined) and the Indochinese peninsula.

Dvārakā was, however, not the only port at the route's terminus. Perhaps more important was Barygaza or Bharukaccha (modern Bharuch, located on the mainland to the east of the Kathiawar peninsula on the river Narbada.

Horse dealers from north-west Kamboja traded as far as Sri Lanka, and there may have been a trading community of them living in Anuradhapura, possibly along with some Greek traders. This trade continued for centuries, long after the Kambhojans had converted to Islam in the 9th century CE.

The chief export products from Kamboja were horses, ponies, blankets embroidered with threads of gold, Kambu/Kambuka silver, zinc, mashapurni, asafoetida, somvalak or punga, walnuts, almonds, saffron, raisins and precious stones including lapis lazuli, green turquoise and emeralds.

=== Historical records: western sea trade ===
The sea trade from the southern end of the Kamboja–Dvārakā Route to the west is documented in Greek, Buddhist and Jain records:

- The 1st-century CE Greek work The Periplus of the Erythraean Sea mentions several seaports on the west coast of India, from Barbarikon at the mouth of the Indus to Bharakuccha, Sopara, Kalyan and Muziris. The Periplus also refers to Saurashtra as a seaboard of Arabia.
- A century later, Ptolemy's The Geographia also refers to Bharakuccha port as a great commercial center situated on the Narbada estuary. Ptolemy also refers to Saurashtra as Syrestrene.
- The 7th-century CE Chinese traveler Yuan Chwang calls Saurashtra Sa-la-ch'a and refers to it as "the highway to the sea where all the inhabitants were traders by profession".
- Undated ancient Jain texts also refer to heavy trade activity in Saurashtran seaports, some of which had become the official residences of international traders. Bharakuccha in particular is described as donamukha, meaning where goods were exchanged freely. The Brhatkalpa describes the port of Sopara as a great commercial center and a residence of numerous traders.
- Other ports mentioned in texts include Vallabhi (modern Vala), a flourishing seaport during the Maitraka dynasty in the 5th through 8th centuries CE. The existence of a port at Kamboi is attested in 10th-century CE records

The commerce of the western Indian coast was lucrative. Bharukacchan and Soparan traders who established settlements or trading posts in the Persian Gulf reaped enormous profits from the Indo-Roman trade and, according to the Vienna Papyrus, written in the mid-2nd century CE, paid high rates of interest.

=== Archaeological evidence: western sea trade ===
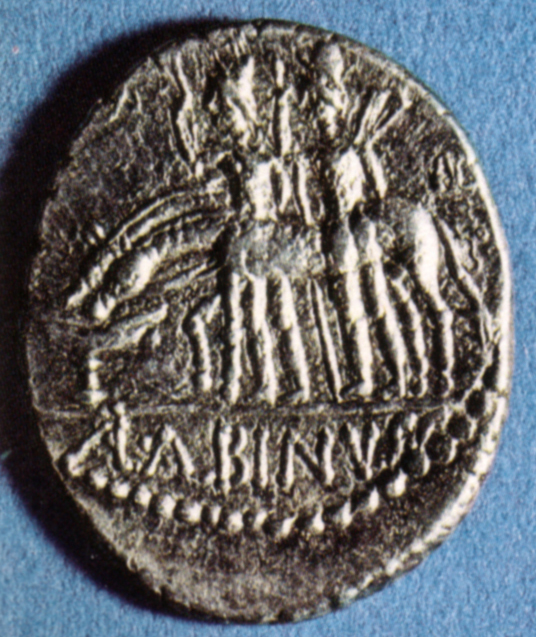
A Roman coin

There is good archaeological evidence of Roman trade goods in the first two centuries CE reaching Kamboja and Bactria through the Gujarati peninsula. Archaeologists have found frescoes, stucco decorations and statuary from ancient Phoenicia and Rome in Bamian, Begram and Taxila in Afghanistan.

Goods from Rome on the trade route included frankincense, coral of various colors (particularly red), figured linen from Egypt, wines, decorated silver vessels, gum, stone, opaque glass and Greek or European slave?women. Roman gold coins were also traded and were usually melted into bullion in Afghanistan, although very little gold came from Rome after 70 CE. In exchange, ships bound for Rome and the west loaded up in Barbaricum/Bharukaccha with lapis lazuli from Badakshan, green turquoise from the Hindu Kush and Chinese silk (mentioned as reaching Barbaricum via Bactria in The Periplus of the Erythraean Sea).

=== Historical records: eastern sea trade ===
The eastern and southern sea trade from the ports at the southern terminus of the Kamboja–Dvārakā Route is described in Buddhist, Jain and Sri Lankan documents.

- Ancient Buddhist references attest that the nations from the northwest, including the Kamboja as well as the Gandhara, Kashmira, Sindhu and Sovira kingdoms were part of a trade loop with western Indian sea ports. Trade ships regularly plied between Bharukaccha, Sopara and other western Indian ports, and southern India, Sri Lanka, Myanmar, Suvannabhumi and the Indochinese peninsula.

The Pali work called Petavatthu says that traders went with caravans with wagons loaded with goods from Dvāravati to Kamboja. The Pali work Apadāna refers to a saint named Bāhiya Dārucīriya who was born in the port of Bharakuccha and according to a commentary who made several trade voyages. He sailed the length of the Indus seven times, and also travelled across the sea as far as Suvannabhumi and returned safely home. Also, the 4th century CE Pali text Sihalavatthu refers to Kambojas being in the Province of Rohana on the island of Tambapanni, or Sri Lanka.

- An undated Jain text mentions a merchant sailing from Bharukaccha and arriving in Sri Lanka in the court of a king named Chandragupta..
- There is also a tradition in Sri Lanka, (recorded in the Pujavaliya) that Tapassu and Bhalluka, the two merchant brothers, natives of Pokkharavati (modern Pushkalavati) in what then was ancient Kamboja-Gandhara and now is the Northwest Frontier Province of Pakistan, "visited the east coast of Ceylon and built a Cetiya there.". In addition, several ancient epigraphic inscriptions found in a cave in Anuradhapura refer to Kamboja corporations and a Grand Kamboja Sangha (community) in ancient Sinhala, as early as the 3rd century BC.
- Several Iranian records mention an embassy from a Sri Lankan king to the Iranian emperor Anusharwan (531–578). The Sri Lankan monarch is reported to have sent the Persian emperor ten elephants, two hundred thousand pieces of teakwood and seven pearl divers.

=== Archaeological evidence: eastern sea trade ===
Archaeological digs in Sri Lanka have turned up coins, beads and intaglios from Bactria and Afghanistan. A fragment of a Gandhara Buddha statue in schist was recently unearthed from the excavations at Jetavanaramaya in Anuradhapura. Other finds in Sri Lanka, such as lapis lazuli of the Badakshan type, connect that island with Kamboja, ancient source of the material.

=== Facts in the original Pali sources ===
According to Malalasekara, in the entry 'Kamboja' in Dictionary of Pali Proper Names: 'The country was evidently on one of the great caravan routes, and there was a road direct from Dvāraka to Kamboja (Pv.p. 23).' The Pali work called Petavatthu that Malalasekera refers to (as Pv.p. 23) says that caravan wagons loaded with goods went from Dvāraka to Kamboja. The introductory story as given in the Petavatthu Commentary says that the thousand caravan carts that went from Dvāravatī to Kamboja passed through an arid desert where they got lost.

With regards Bāhiya Dārucīriya, Malalasekara writes that he 'engaged himself in trade, voyaging in a ship. Seven times he sailed down the Indus and across the sea and returned safely home. On the eighth occasion, while on his way to Suvaṇṇabhūmi, his ship was wrecked, and he floated ashore on a plank, reaching land near Suppāraka.'

The Apadāna verses of Bāhiya say that he was born in the town of Bhārukaccha ( modern Bharuch) and departed on a ship from there. After being on sea for a few days, he fell into the sea due to a frightful, horrible sea-monster (makara), but on a plank managed to reach the port of Suppāraka.

The source for Malalasekera's statement that Bāhiya sailed down the Indus and went to Suvaṇṇabhūmi is the Udāna Commentary of Dhammapāla, which says that Bāhiya was born in the country of Bāhiya, and was a merchant. Masefield translates the commentary as follows: 'He filled a ship with abundant goods, ... , for the purposes of trade, entered upon the ocean and, in successively roaming about, on seven occasions approached his own city via an expedition up the Indus. But on the eighth occasion, he embarked into his ship with his goods loaded on board thinking he would go to Suvaṇṇabhūmi. Having ventured deep into the Great Ocean, the ship went off-course in the midst of the ocean, without reaching the desired destination, with the people (on board) becoming a meal for fish and turtles. But Bāhiya, being tossed about ever so slowly by the motion of the waves as he made his way (to safety) after grabbing hold of a ship’s plank, on the seventh day reached the shore in the locality of the port of Suppāraka.'

The port of Suppāraka, is either modern Sopara near Bhārukaccha or modern Bharuch, or Vasai near Mumbai, about 290 kilometers south of Bhārukaccha.
