= Gujarat Sultanate =

Late medieval kingdom in India (1394–1573)

Sultanate of Gujarat سلطنت گجرات (Persian) Gujarāt Saltanat (Gujarati)
- 1394–1573
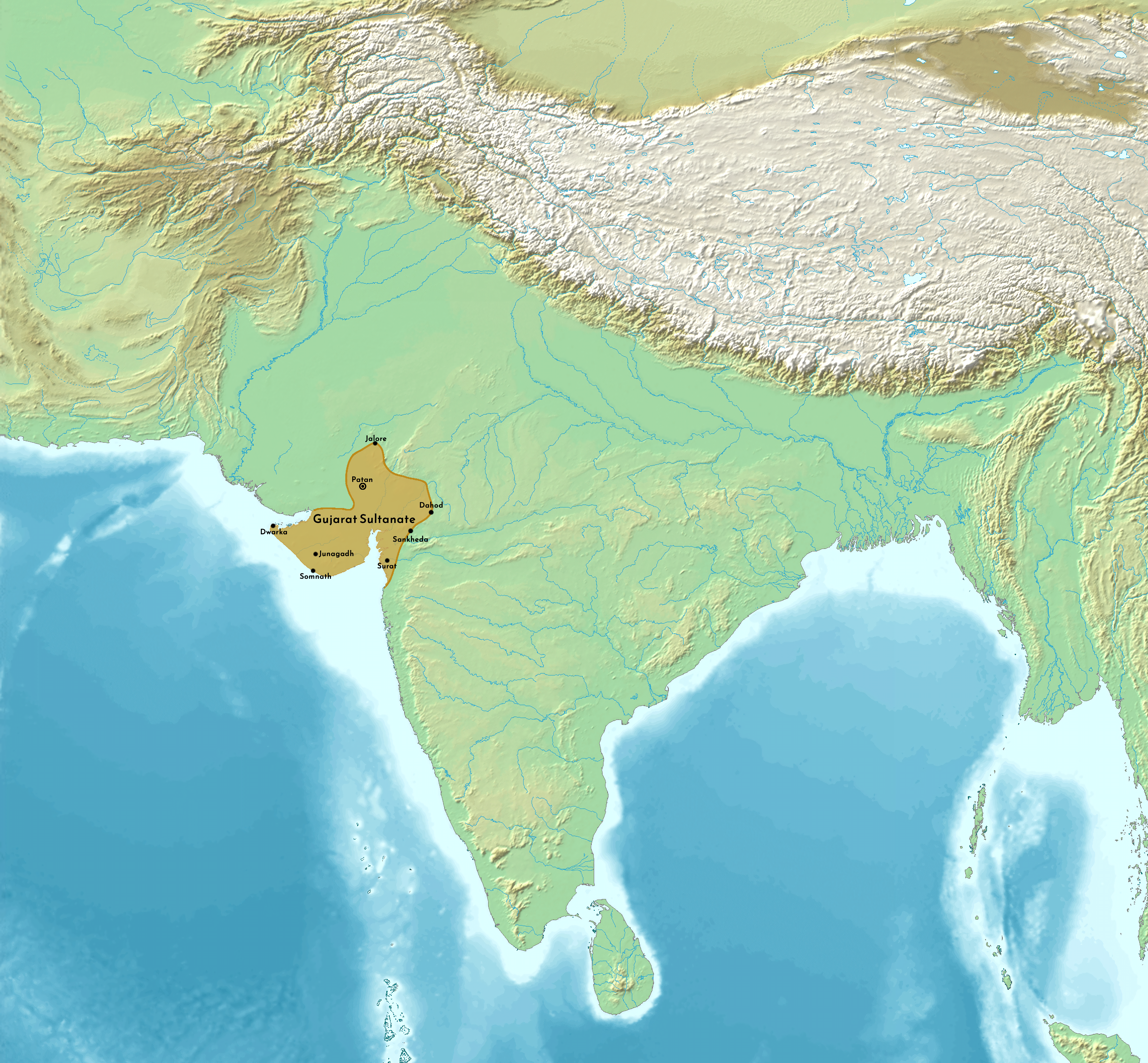
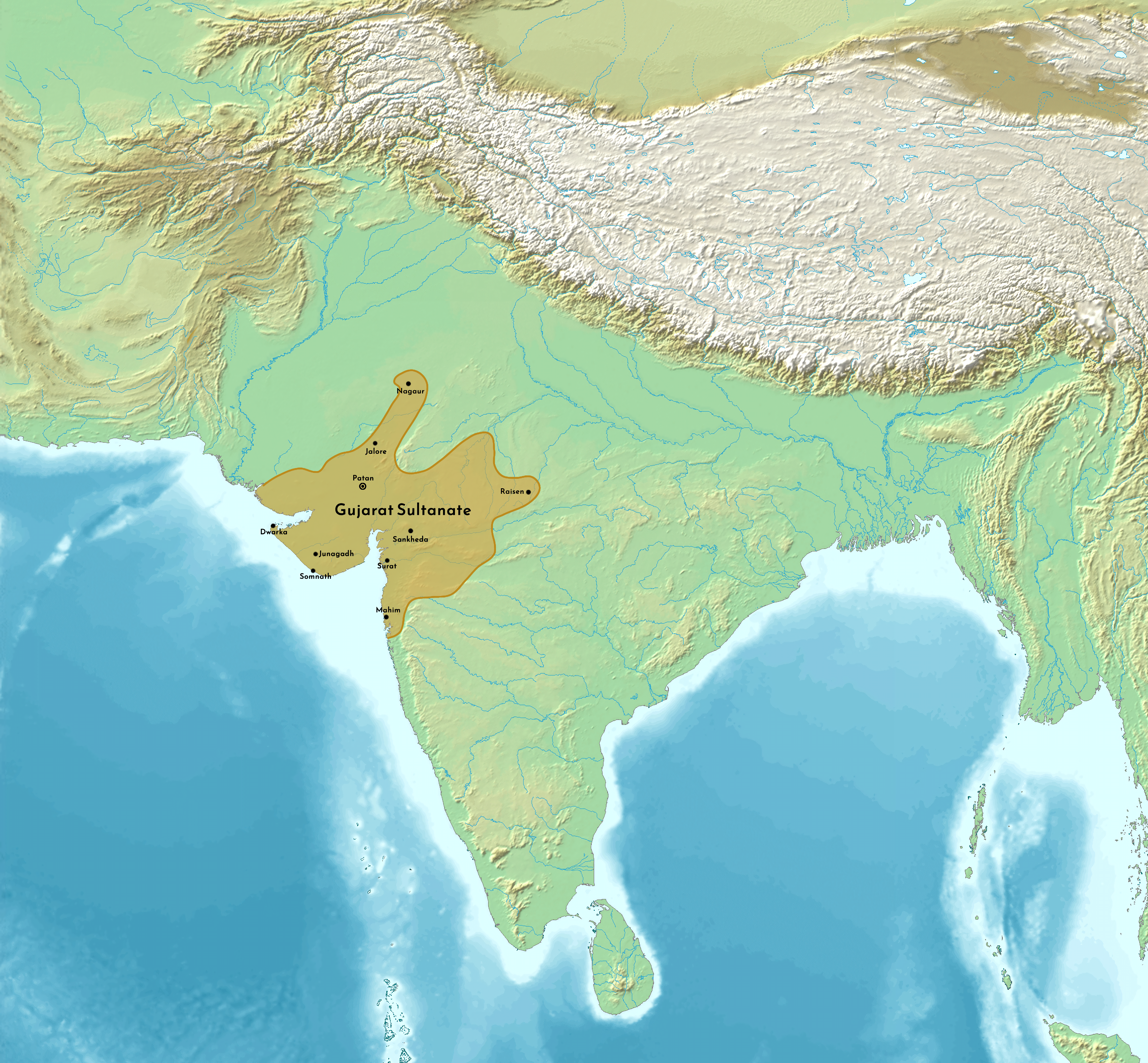
- Status: Sultanate
- Capital: Anhilwad Patan (1407–1411); Ahmedabad (1411–1484, 1535–1573); Champaner (1484–1535)
- Common languages: Persian (official); Middle Gujarati (Lingua franca)
- Religion: Islam
- Government: Absolute Monarchy
- Sultan
  - 1407–1411: Muzaffar Shah I (first)
  - 1561–1573, 1584: Muzaffar Shah III (last)
- Historical era: Medieval India
  - Declared independence from Delhi Sultanate: 1394
  - Invasion of Malwa: 1407
  - Konkan War: 1429–1431
  - Conquest of Junagadh: 1467–1470
  - Siege of Champaner: 1483–1484
  - Conquest of Malwa: 1531
  - Treaty of Bassein: 1534
  - Annexed by Mughals: 1573
  - Battle of Bhuchar Mori: July 1591
- Currency: Taka
Preceded by
| Delhi Sultanate |
| Malwa Sultanate |
| Chudasama dynasty |
Succeeded by
| Mughal Empire |
- Today part of: India

The Gujarat Sultanate or Sultanate of Gujarat was a late medieval Indian state in Western India, primarily based in the present-day state of Gujarat. The kingdom was established in 1394 when Muzaffar Shah I, the governor of Gujarat, declared independence from the Tughlaq dynasty of Delhi.

Following Timur's invasion of the Delhi Sultanate, Delhi was devastated and its rule weakened considerably, leading Muzaffar Shah to declare himself independent in 1394, and formally established the Sultanate in Gujarat. The next sultan, his grandson Ahmad Shah I, moved the capital to Ahmedabad in 1411. His successor Muhammad Shah II subdued most Rajput chieftains. The prosperity of the sultanate reached its zenith during the rule of Mahmud Begada. He also subdued most Gujarati Rajput chieftains and built a navy off the coast of Diu. The greatest territorial extent was achieved under Bahadur Shah.

In 1509, the Portuguese Empire wrested Diu from the Sultanate in the Battle of Diu. The Mughal emperor Humayun attacked Gujarat in 1535 and briefly occupied it, during which Bombay, Bassein and Daman would become a Portuguese colony, thereafter Bahadur Shah was killed by the Portuguese while making a deal in 1537. The end of the sultanate came in 1573, when Akbar annexed the Gujarat Sultanate into his empire. The last ruler, Muzaffar Shah III, was taken a prisoner to Agra. In 1583, he escaped from the prison, and with the help of the nobles, succeeded to regain the throne for a short period before being defeated by Akbar's minister Abdul Rahim Khan-i-Khanan.

== Origin ==
The Muzaffarid dynasty of Gujarat was founded by Zafar Khan, later titled Muzaffar Shah I. His ancestors were of indigenous Muslim origin, Zafar Khan being described as the son of a "peasant convert to Islam" by Richard M. Eaton.

The main source from the period providing some details regarding his ancestry is that of the 16th-century Gujarati court historian Sikandar ibn Manjhu, author of the Persian chronicle Mir’āt-i-Sikandarī. According to Mir’āt-i-Sikandarī, Zafar Khan belonged to a sect of Khatris (Persian: khtry) known as Tanks (Persian: tāk or tānk), and that Tanks and Khatris were originally single community which later separated when the former were expelled for their fondness for drinking (Persian: khumar). Sikandar also denied the local traditions that the ancestors of the dynasty were Kalal (Persian: khumar), a wine-brewing and selling caste. This account of descent from Tank subcaste of Khatris is repeated by ʿAlī Muḥammad Khān, an 18th-century Mughal divan of Gujarat in his Mirʾāt-i Aḥmadī, where he lists the Mirʾāt-i Sikandarī among the works he used as sources. Following these sources, a number of modern historians including André Wink, S. C. Misra and Sanjay Subrahmanyam describe Zafar Khan as hailing from the Tank subgroup of the Khatri caste, originally from Punjab, although he himself was born in Delhi.

A 15th-century Sanskrit poem Rājavinoda written by Udayaraja for Sultan Mahmud Begada traces his ancestry from the Solar dynasty, hence giving him a Kshatriya lineage. The medieval historian Sikandar also noted the tradition among Hindu Tank subcaste of Khatris of being descended from Ramacandra. Based on these traditions, some historians such as Aparna Kapadia consider the Muzaffarids to be of Rajput status.

According to Sikandar, their conversion to Islam was linked to a marital alliance in which Sultan Firuz Shah Tughlaq married Sahāran's sister, which facilitated the family’s rise in status and influence. Zafar Khan had a Khatri as his divan when he was appointed governor of Gujarat, and several of his prominent nobles were also Khatris.

== History ==
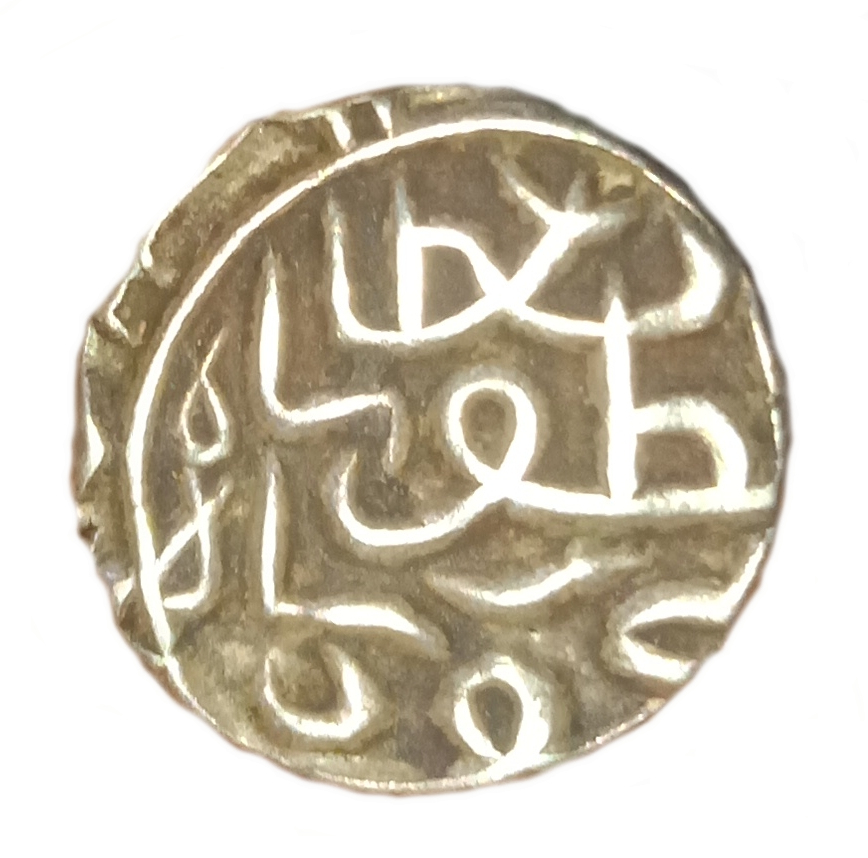
Silver Tanka of Nasir al-din Mahmud Shah III, Sultanate of Gujarat.

=== Early rulers ===
It is said that Zafar Khan's father Wajih-ul-Mulk (Saharan) and his brother were influential Chaudharis who were agriculturists by profession but could also muster thousands of fighting men on their call. Sahāran (also spelled Sadhāran), the father of Zafar Khan, originally lived in Thanesar in present-day Haryana. Delhi Sultan Firuz Shah Tughluq appointed Malik Mufarrah, also known as Farhat-ul-Mulk and Rasti Khan governor of Gujarat in 1377. In 1387, Sikandar Khan was sent to replace him, but he was defeated and killed by Farhat-ul-Mulk. In 1391, Sultan Nasir-ud-Din Muhammad bin Tughluq appointed Zafar Khan, the son of Wajih-ul-Mulk as governor of Gujarat and conferred him the title of Muzaffar Khan (r. 1391–1403, 1404–1411). In 1392, he defeated Farhat-ul-Mulk in the battle of Kamboi, near Anhilwada Patan and occupied the city of Anhilwada Patan.

In 1403, Zafar Khan's son Tatar Khan urged his father to march on Delhi, which he declined. As a result, in 1403, Tatar imprisoned him in Ashawal (future Ahmedabad) and declared himself sultan under the title of Muhammad Shah I (r. 1403–1404). He marched towards Delhi, but on the way he was poisoned by his uncle, Shams Khan. After the death of Muhammad Shah, Muzaffar was released from the prison and he took over the control over administration. In 1407, he declared himself as Sultan Muzaffar Shah I, took the insignia of royalty and issued coins in his name. After his death in 1411, he was succeeded by his grandson, the son of Tatar Khan, Ahmad Shah I.

=== Ahmad Shah I ===
Soon after his accession, Ahmad Shah I was faced with a rebellion of his uncles. The rebellion was led by his eldest uncle Firuz Khan, who declared himself king. Firuz Khan assembled forces at Vadodara and marched to Nadiad, where a group of rebels joined him including Husam al Mulk Bhandari, Malik Ahmad, Malik Shah, Jiwandas Khatri, and Prayagdas, after which they moved to secure Khambhat, but divisions among the insurgent leaders reportedly led to an internal scuffle in which Jiwandas Khatri was killed. The rebels then took Bharuch in January 1411 and awaited assistance from Hoshang Shah of Malwa, while Ahmad Shah advanced from Patan to Bharuch on 28 January 1411 and attempted to end the revolt through conciliatory letters and offers of amnesty. During this rebellion Sultan Hushang Shah of Malwa Sultanate invaded Gujarat. He was repelled this time but he invaded again in 1417 along with Nasir Khan, the Farooqi dynasty ruler of Khandesh and occupied Sultanpur and Nandurbar. Gujarat army defeated them and later Ahmad Shah led four expeditions into Malwa in 1419, 1420, 1422 and 1438.

In 1429, Kanha Raja of Jhalawad with the help of the Bahmani Sultan Ahmad Shah ravaged Nandurbar. But Ahmad Shah's army defeated the Bahmani army and they fled to Daulatabad. The Bahmani Sultan Ahmad Shah sent strong reinforcements and the Khandesh army also joined them. They were again defeated by the Gujarat army. Finally, Ahmad Shah annexed Thana and Mahim from Bahmani Sultanate.

At the beginning of his reign, he founded the city of Ahmedabad which he styled as Shahr-i-Mu'azzam (the great city) on the banks of Sabarmati River. He shifted the capital from Anhilwada Patan to Ahmedabad. The Jami Masjid (1423) in Ahmedabad were built during his reign. Sultan Ahmad Shah died in 1443 and succeeded by his eldest son Muhammad Shah II.

=== Successors of Ahmad Shah I ===
Muhammad Shah II (r. 1442–1451) first led a campaign against Idar and forced its ruler, Raja Hari Rai or Bir Rai to submit to his authority. He then exacted tribute from the Rawal of Dungarpur. In 1449, he marched against Champaner, but the ruler of Champaner, Raja Kanak Das, with the help of Malwa Sultan Mahmud Khilji forced him to retreat. On the return journey, he fell seriously ill and died in February 1451. After his death, he was succeeded by his son Qutb-ud-Din Ahmad Shah II (r. 1451–1458). Ahmad Shah II defeated Khilji at the Battle of Kapadvanj. He helped Firuz Khan ruling from Nagaur against Rana Kumbha of Chittor's attempt to overthrow him. After death of Ahmad Shah II in 1458, the nobles raised his uncle Daud Khan, son of Ahmad Shah I, to the throne.

=== Mahmud Begada ===
Location of the Gujarat Sultanate and neighbouring polities, circa 1500 CE.

But within a short period of seven or twenty-seven days, the nobles deposed Daud Khan and set on the throne Fath Khan, son of Muhammad Shah II. Fath Khan, on his accession, adopted the title Abu-al Fath Mahmud Shah, popularly known as Mahmud Begada. He expanded the kingdom in all directions. He received the sobriquet Begada, which literally means the conqueror of two forts, probably after conquering Girnar (Junagadh) and Champaner (Pavagadh) forts. Mahmud died on 23 November 1511.

=== Muzaffar Shah II and his successors ===
Khalil Khan, son of Mahmud Begada succeeded his father with the title Muzaffar Shah II. In 1519, Rana Sanga of Chittor defeated a joint army of Malwa and Gujarat sultanates and took Mahmud Shah II of Malwa captive. Muzaffar Shah sent an army to Malwa but their service was not required as Rana Sanga had generously restored Mahmud Shah II to the throne. However, Rana Sanga defeated Ibrahim Lodhi of Delhi at Battle of Dholpur around the same time and Conquered Much of Malwa along with Chanderi and he bestowed it to his Vassal Medini Rai who ruled over Malwa under his lordship with Chanderi as his capital.The victory brought Rajputs within day's march of Agra and Delhi and made them contender of supremacy of Northern India. Rana Sanga later invaded Gujarat and plundered the Sultanate's treasuries, greatly damaging its prestige, Sanga also annexed northern Gujarat and appointed one of his Rajput vassals to rule there. The invasion of Rana weakened Gujarat, however after Rana Sanga's death, the sultans of Gujarat freed their kingdom from Rajputs and grew even more powerful as they sacked Chittor fort in 1535. He died on 5 April 1526 and was succeeded by his eldest son, Sikandar.

After few months, Sikandar Sháh was murdered by a noble Imád-ul-Mulk, who seated a younger brother of Sikandar, named Násir Khán, on the throne with the title of Mahmúd Shah II and governed on his behalf. Other son of Muzaffar Shah II, Bhadur Khan returned from outside of Gujarat and the nobles joined him. Bahádur marched at once on Chámpáner, captured and executed Imád-ul-Mulk and poisoning Násir Khán ascended the throne in 1527 with the title of Bahádur Sháh.

=== Bahadur Shah and his successors ===
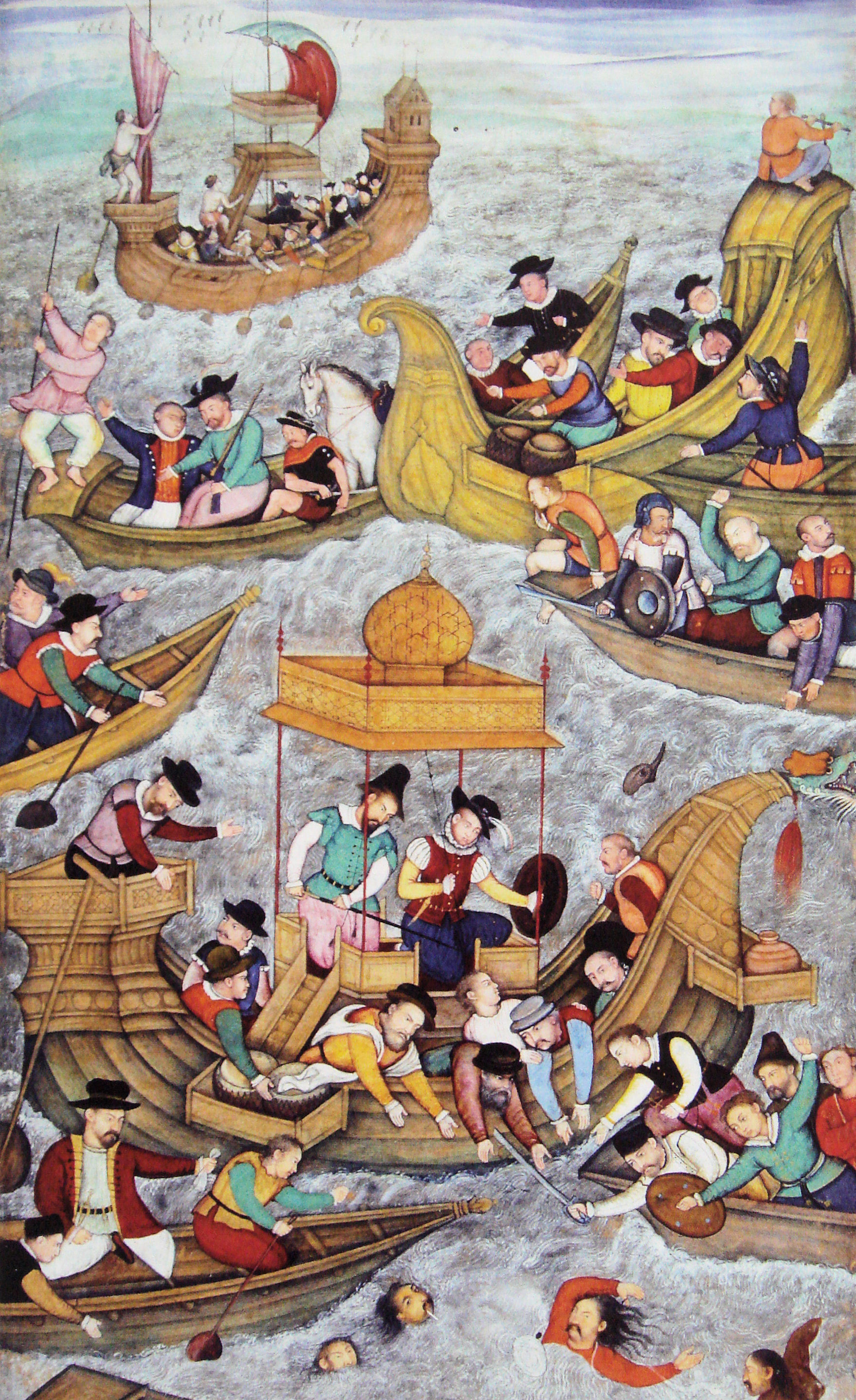
Death of Bahadur Shah of Gujarat an Ottoman ally at the Siege of Diu. He was killed fighting against the Portuguese in 1537; (Illustration from the Akbarnama, end of 16th century).

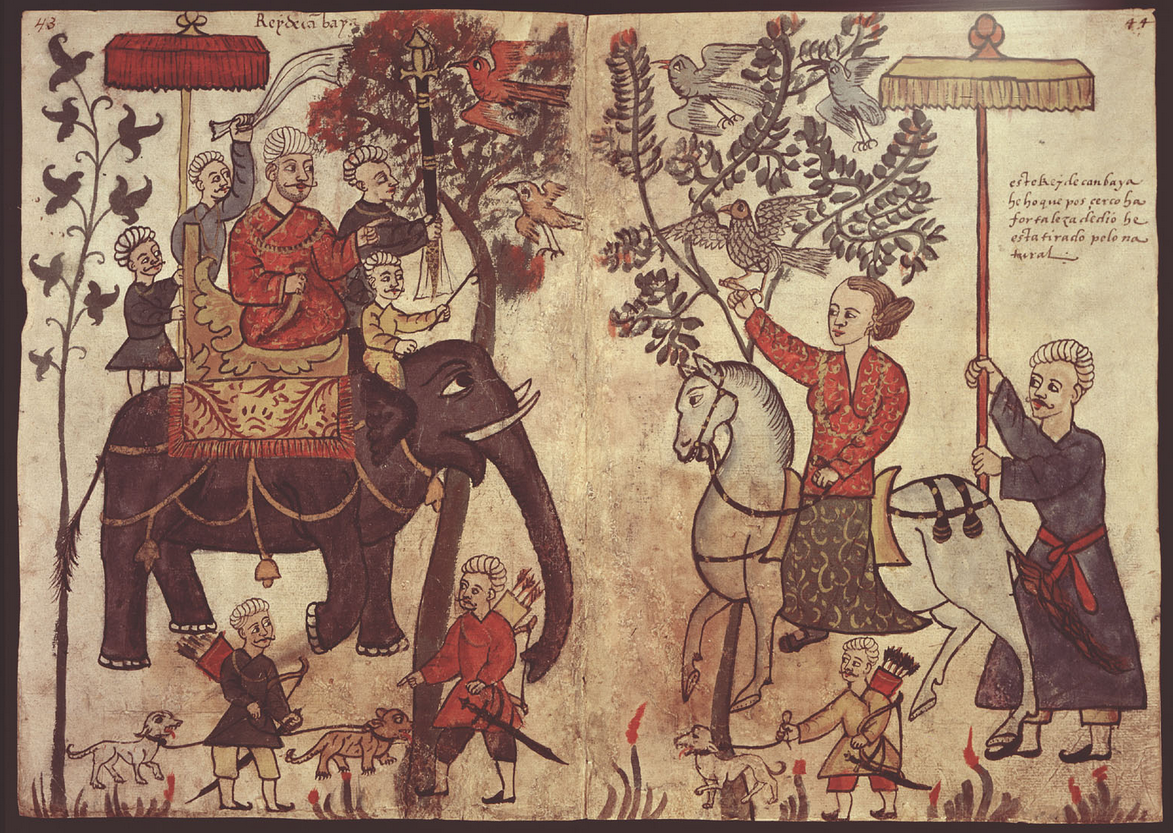
Portuguese depiction of the Sultan of Gujarat

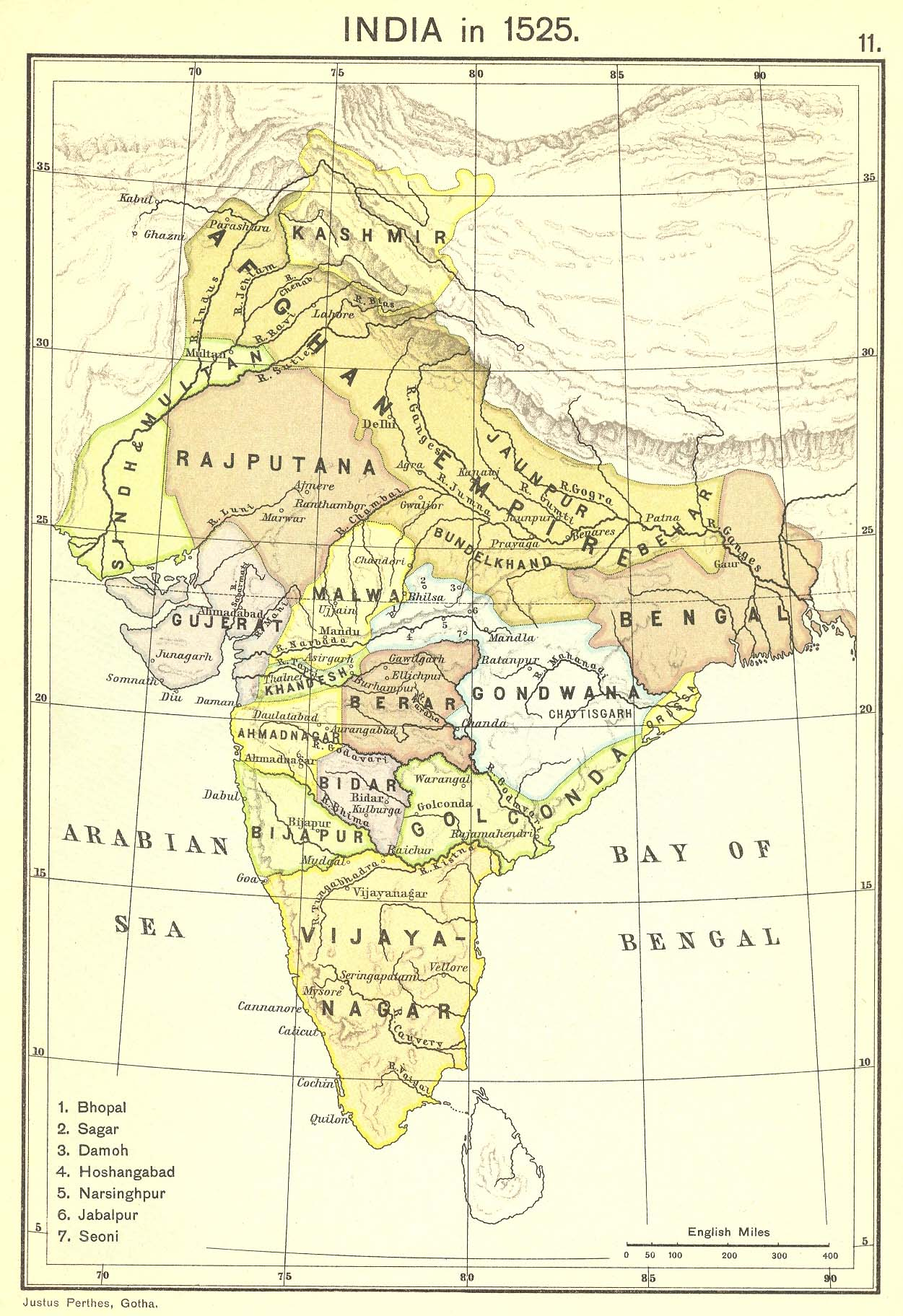
Gujarat Sultanate in 1525

Bahadur Shah expanded his kingdom and made expeditions to help neighbouring kingdoms. In 1532, Gujarat came under attack of the Mughal Emperor Humayun and fell. Bahadur Shah regained the kingdom in 1536 but he was killed by the Portuguese on board the ship when making a deal with them.

Bahadur had no son, hence there was some uncertainty regarding succession after his death. Muhammad Zaman Mirza, the fugitive Mughal prince made his claim on the ground that Bahadur's mother adopted him as her son. The nobles selected Bahadur's nephew Miran Muhammad Shah of Khandesh as his successor, but he died on his way to Gujarat. Finally, the nobles selected Mahmud Khan, the son of Bahadur's brother Latif Khan as his successor and he ascended to the throne as Mahmud Shah III in 1538. Mahmud Shah III had to battle with his nobles who were interested in independence. He was killed in 1554 by his servant. Ahmad Shah III succeeded him but now the reigns of the state were controlled by the nobles who divided the kingdom between themselves. He was assassinated in 1561. He was succeeded by Muzaffar Shah III.

=== Muzaffar Shah III ===
Muzaffar Shah III's army was legendary in some parts of Africa and the Asian mainland with the exception of China, and free soldiers, mercenaries, and slaves forced to join wars alike came from these places. Its stealth specialists performed several duties including bodyguard work and skirmish combat. Many stealth warriors were Habshi or Africans.

However, Mughal Emperor Akbar annexed Gujarat in his empire in 1573 and Gujarat became a Mughal subah. Muzaffar Shah III was taken prisoner to Agra. In 1583, he escaped from the prison and with the help of the nobles succeeded to regain the throne for a short period before being defeated by Akbar's general Abdul Rahim Khan-I-Khana in January 1584. He fled and finally took asylum under Jam Sataji of Nawanagar State. The Battle of Bhuchar Mori was fought between the Mughal forces led by Mirza Aziz Koka and the combined Kathiawar forces in 1591 to protect him. He finally committed suicide when he was surrendered to the Mughal.

== Gunpowder weapons ==
The Gujarat Sultanate was the second empire in the Indian subcontinent to utilize and invent firearms and gunpowder artillery extensively, following the Bahmani Sultanate.

Image gallery

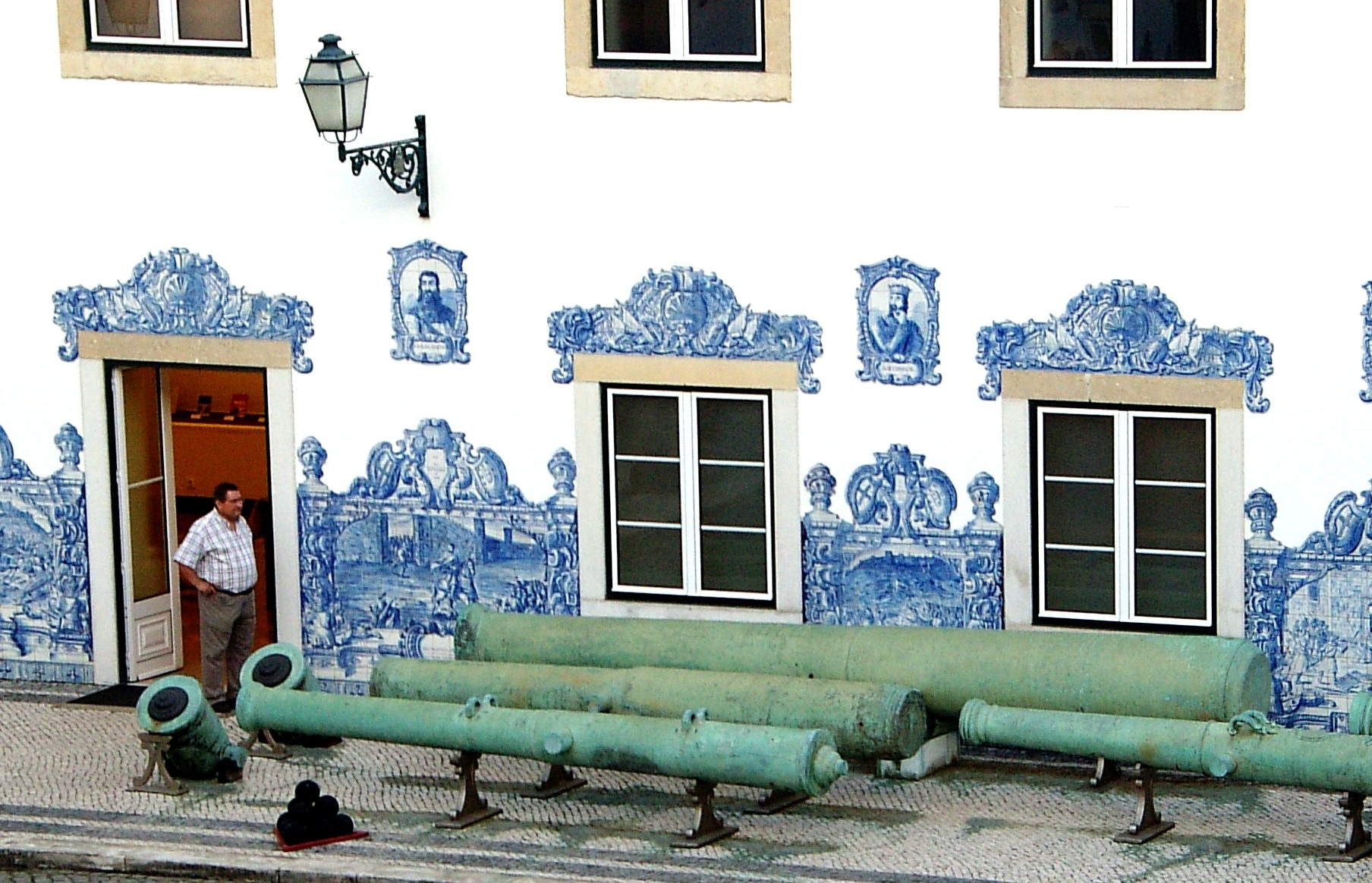

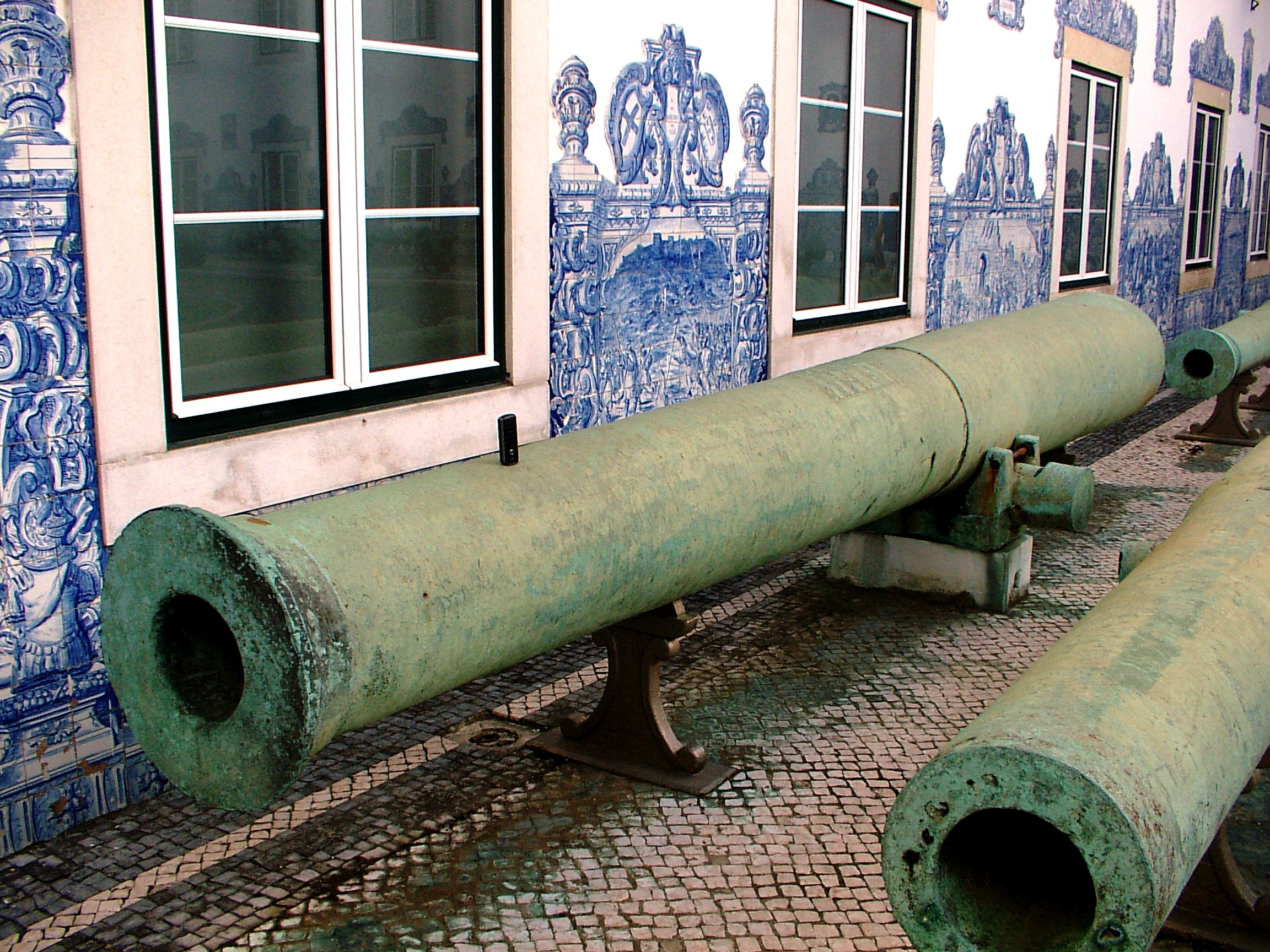
Close up of the gun

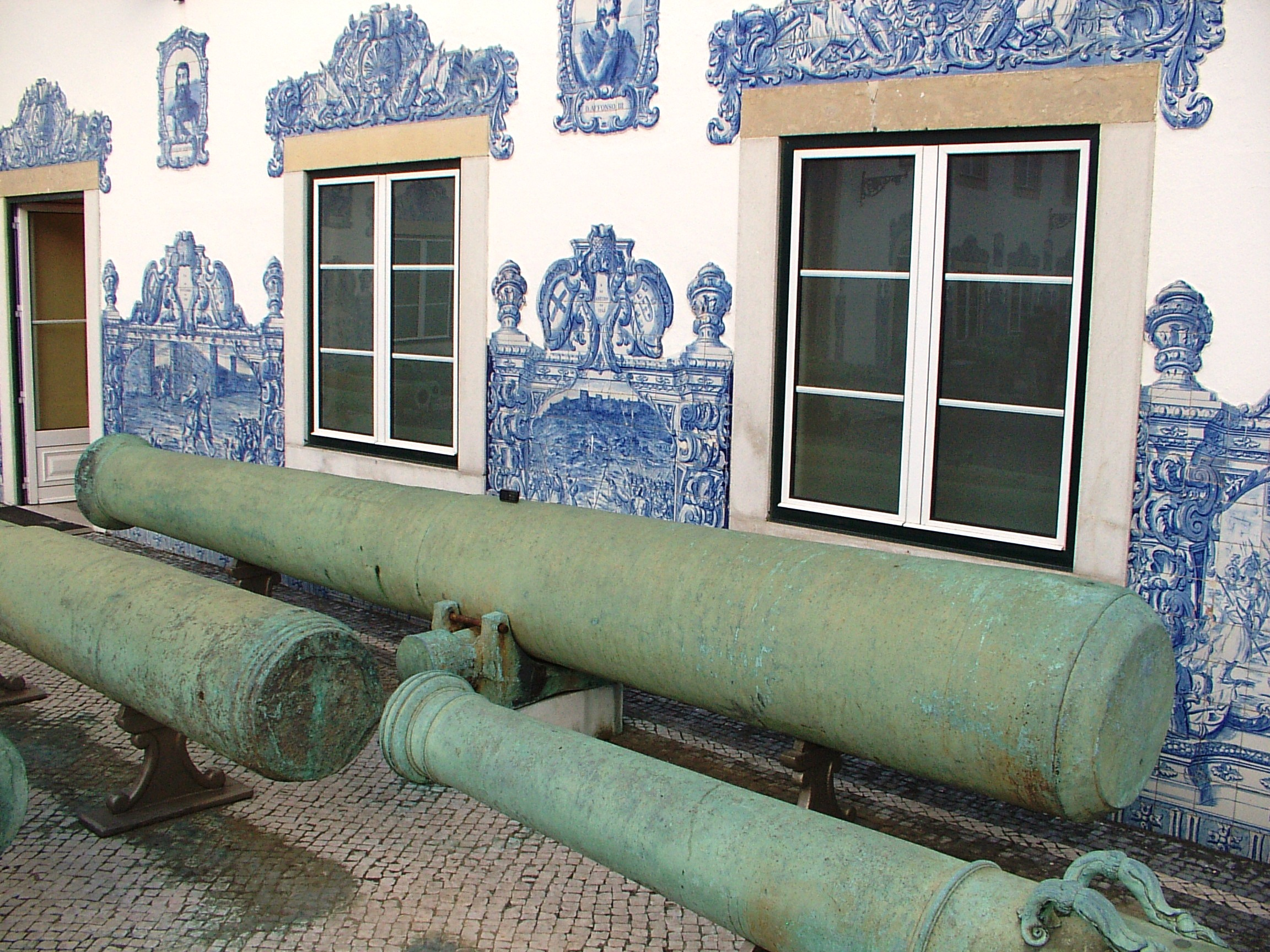
Alternate view

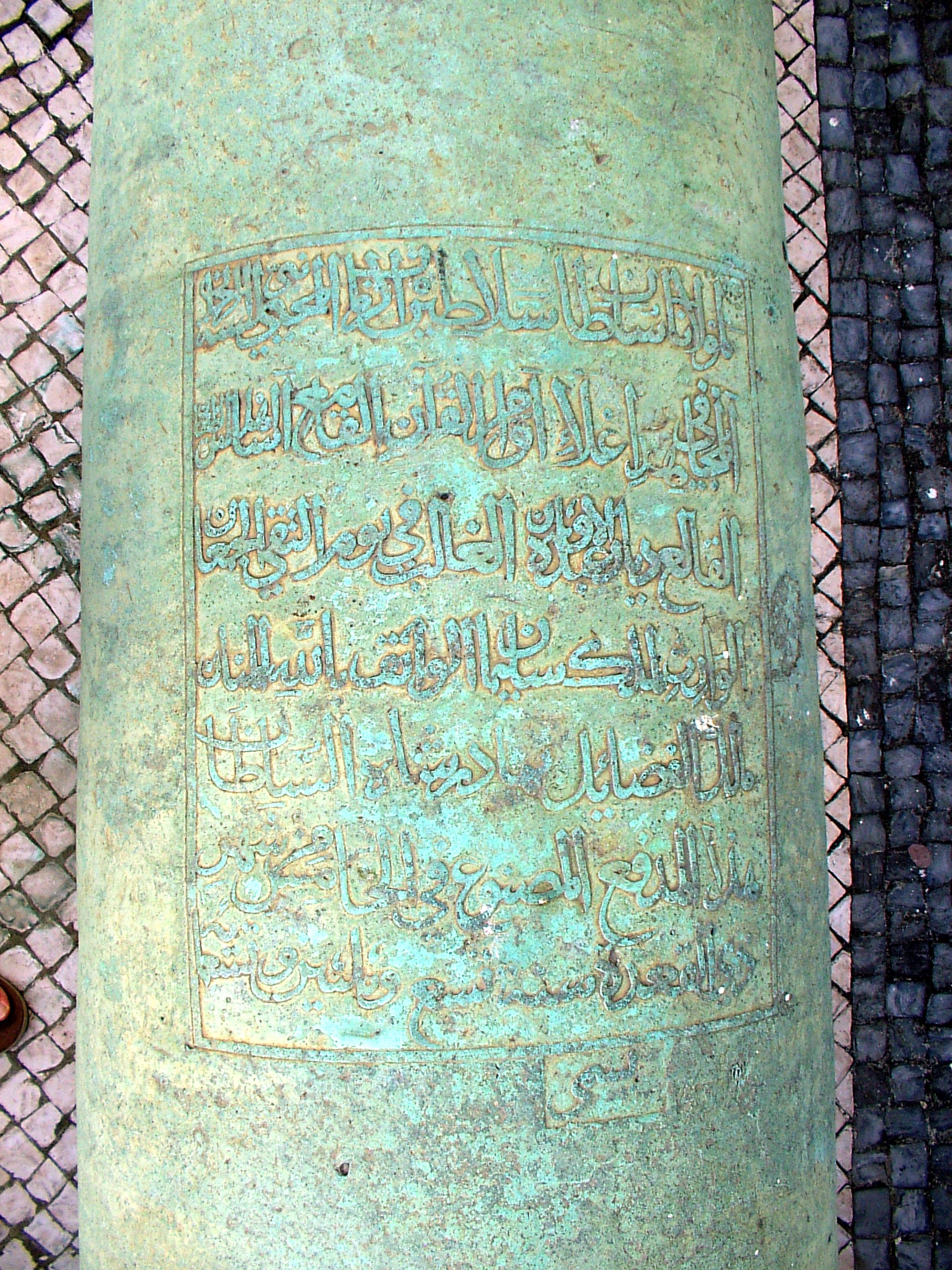
Arabic inscriptions

== Administration ==
Gujarat was divided politically into two main parts; one, called the khálsah or crown domain administered directly by the central authority; the other, on payment of tribute in service or in money, left under the control of its former rulers. The amount of tribute paid by the different chiefs depended, not on the value of their territory, but on the terms granted to them when they agreed to become feudatories of the king. This tribute was occasionally collected by military expeditions headed by the king in person and called mulkgíri or country-seizing circuits.

The internal management of the feudatory states was unaffected by their payment of tribute. Justice was administered and the revenue collected in the same way as under the Chaulukya kings. The revenue consisted, as before, of a share of the crops received in kind, supplemented by the levy of special cesses, trade, and transit dues. The chief's share of the crops differed according to the locality; it rarely exceeded one-third of the produce, it rarely fell short of one-sixth. From some parts the chief's share was realised directly from the cultivator by agents called mantris; from other parts the collection was through superior landowners.

Districts and crown lands

The Ahmedabad kings divided the portion of their territory which was under their direct authority into districts or sarkars. These districts were administered in one of two ways. They were either assigned to nobles in support of a contingent of troops, or they were set apart as crown domains and managed by paid officers. The officers placed in charge of districts set apart as crown domains were called muktiă. Their chief duties were to preserve the peace and to collect the revenue. For the maintenance of order, a body of soldiers from the army headquarters at Ahmedabad was detached for service in each of these divisions, and placed under the command of the district governor. At the same time, in addition to the presence of this detachment of regular troops, every district contained certain fortified outposts called thánás, varying in number according to the character of the country and the temper of the people. These posts were in charge of officers called thánadárs subordinate to the district governor. They were garrisoned by bodies of local soldiery, for whose maintenance, in addition to money payments, a small assignment of land was set apart in the neighbourhood of the post. On the arrival of the tribute-collecting army the governors of the districts through which it passed were expected to join the main body with their local contingents. At other times the district governors had little control over the feudatory chiefs in the neighbourhood of their charge. The Gujarat Sultanate had comprised twenty-five sarkars (Jodhpur, Jalor, Nagor, Sirohi, Dungarpur, Banswada, Patan, Ahmadabad, Baroda, Broach, Surat, Godhra, Champanir, Sunt, Nadaut, Sorath, Navanagar, Kutch, Nandurbar, Mulher, Ramnagar, Daman, Bassein, Mumbai and Danda Rajapuri).

Fiscal

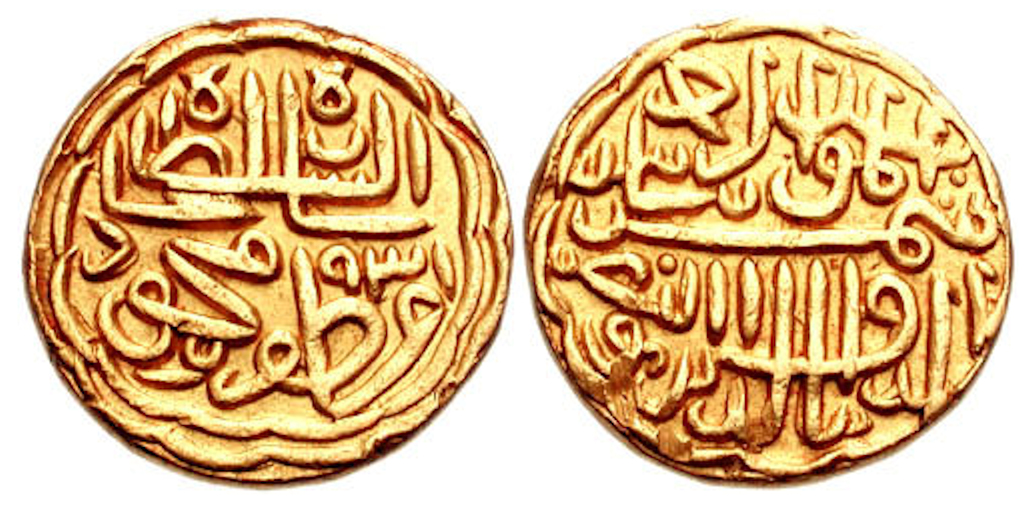
Coinage of Shams al-Din Muzaffar Shah II (1511–1525).

For fiscal purposes each district or sarkár was distributed among a certain number of sub-divisions or parganáhs, each under a paid official styled ámil or tahsildár. These sub-divisional officers realised the state demand, nominally one-half of the produce, by the help of the headmen of the villages under their charge. In the sharehold and simple villages of North Gujarat these village headmen were styled Patel or according to Muslim writers mukaddams and in the simple villages of the south they were known as Desai. They arranged for the final distribution of the total demand in joint villages among the shareholders, and in simple villages from the individual cultivators. The sub-divisional officer presented a statement of the accounts of the villages in his sub-division to the district officer, whose record of the revenue of his whole district was in turn forwarded to the head revenue officer at court. As a check on the internal management of his charge, and especially to help him in the work of collecting the revenue, with each district governor was associated an accountant. Further that each of these officers might be the greater check on the other, Ahmad Shah I enforced the rule that when the governor was chosen from among the royal slaves the accountant should be a free man, and that when the accountant was a slave the district governor should be chosen from some other class. This practise was maintained till the end of the reign of Muzaffar Sháh II, when, according to the Mirăt-i-Áhmedi, the army became much increased, and the ministers, condensing the details of revenue, farmed it on contract, so that many parts formerly yielding one rupee now produced ten, and many others seven eight or nine, and in no place was there a less increase than from ten to twenty per cent. Many other changes occurred at the same time, and the spirit of innovation creeping into the administration the wholesome system of checking the accounts was given up and mutiny and confusion spread over Gujarat.

== Historiography ==
Mirat-i-Sikandari is a Persian work on the complete history of Gujarat Sultanate written by Sikandar, son of Muhammad aka Manjhu, son of Akbar who wrote it soon after Akbar conquered Gujarat. He had consulted earlier works of history and the people of authority. Other Persian works of the history of Gujarat Sultanate are Tarikh-i-Muzaffar Shahi about reign of Muzaffar Shah I, Tarik-i-Ahmad Shah in verse by Hulvi Shirazi, Tarikh-i-Mahmud Shahi, Tabaqat-i-Mahmud Shahi, Maathi-i-Mahmud Shahi about Mahmud I, Tarikh-i-Muzaffar Shahi about Muzaffar Shah II's conquest of Mandu, Tarikh-i-Bahadur Shahi aka Tabaqat-i-Husam Khani, Tarikh-i-Gujarat by Abu Turab Vali, Mirat-i-Ahmadi.

Other important work in Arabic about history of Gujarat includes Zafarul-Walih bi Muzaffar wa Alih by Hajji Dabir. Ranchod Amarji, diwan of Junagadh, wrote in Persian the Tarikh-I-Sorath, a history of the Sorath region, in 1825.

== Architecture ==
The distinctive Indo-Islamic architecture style of Gujarat drew micro-architectural elements from earlier Maru-Gurjara architecture and employed them in mihrab, roofs, doors, minarets and facades. In the 15th century, the Indo-Islamic style of Gujarat is especially notable for its inventive and elegant use of minarets. They are often in pairs flanking the main entrance, mostly rather thin and with elaborate carving at least at the lower levels. Some designs push out balconies at intervals up the shaft; the most extreme version of this was in the lost upper parts of the so-called "shaking minarets" at the Jama Mosque, Ahmedabad, which fell down in an earthquake in 1819. This carving draws on the traditional skills of local stone-carvers, previously exercised on Hindu temples in the Māru-Gurjara and other local styles. The Gujarat Sultans built lavishly, particularly in the capital, Ahmedabad. The sultanate commissioned mosques such as the Jami Masjid of Ahmedabad, Jama Masjid at Champaner, Qutbuddin Mosque, Rani Rupamati Mosque, Sarkhej Roza, Sidi Bashir Mosque, Kevada Mosque, Sidi Sayyed Mosque, Nagina Mosque and Pattharwali Masjid, as well as structures such as Teen Darwaza, Bhadra Fort and the Dada Harir Stepwell in Ahmedabad.

The Champaner-Pavagadh Archaeological Park, the 16th century capital of Gujarat Sultanate, documents the early Islamic and pre-Mughal city that has remained without any change.

Upon his passing at the age of 111, Ahmed Shah's son erected a mausoleum and mosque in his honor. Sultan Mahmud Begada, enamored with the site as a summer retreat, expanded it with additional structures such as a small mosque, mausoleum, and palaces, alongside the water tank. Spanning 72 acres, it comprised these edifices, as well as gardens teeming with flowering plants and fruit trees. Serving as a focal point of royal life, it hosted gatherings, religious ceremonies, and spiritual discussions within its palaces, pavilions, and water tanks.

Indo-Islamic architecture style of Gujarat presages many of the architectural elements later found in Mughal architecture, including ornate mihrabs and minarets, jali (perforated screens carved in stone), and chattris (pavilions topped with cupolas).

=== Gallery ===
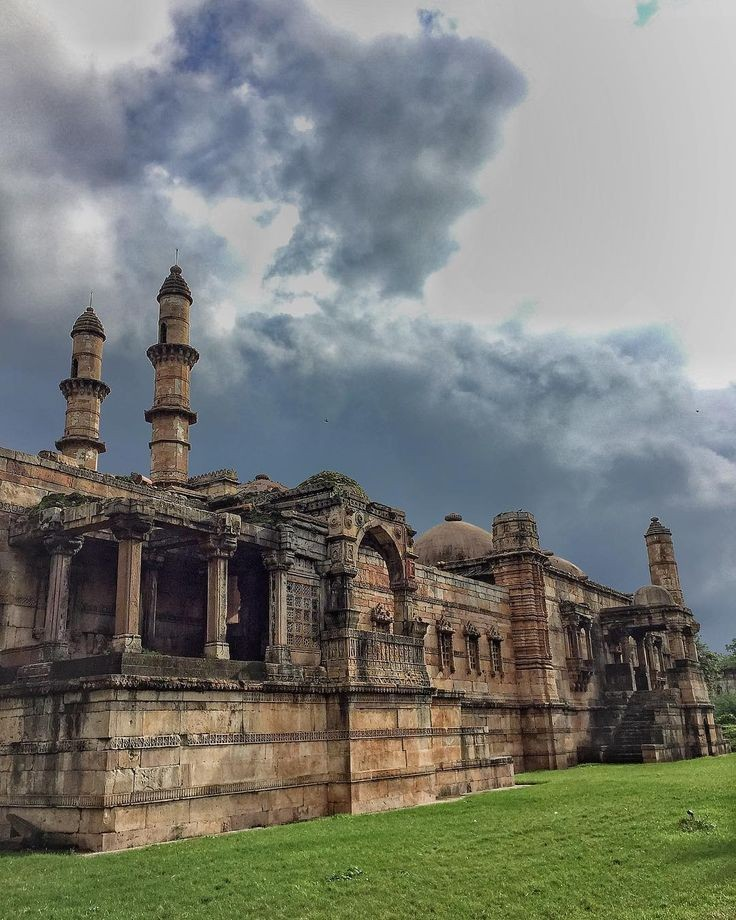
Jami Mosque, Champaner

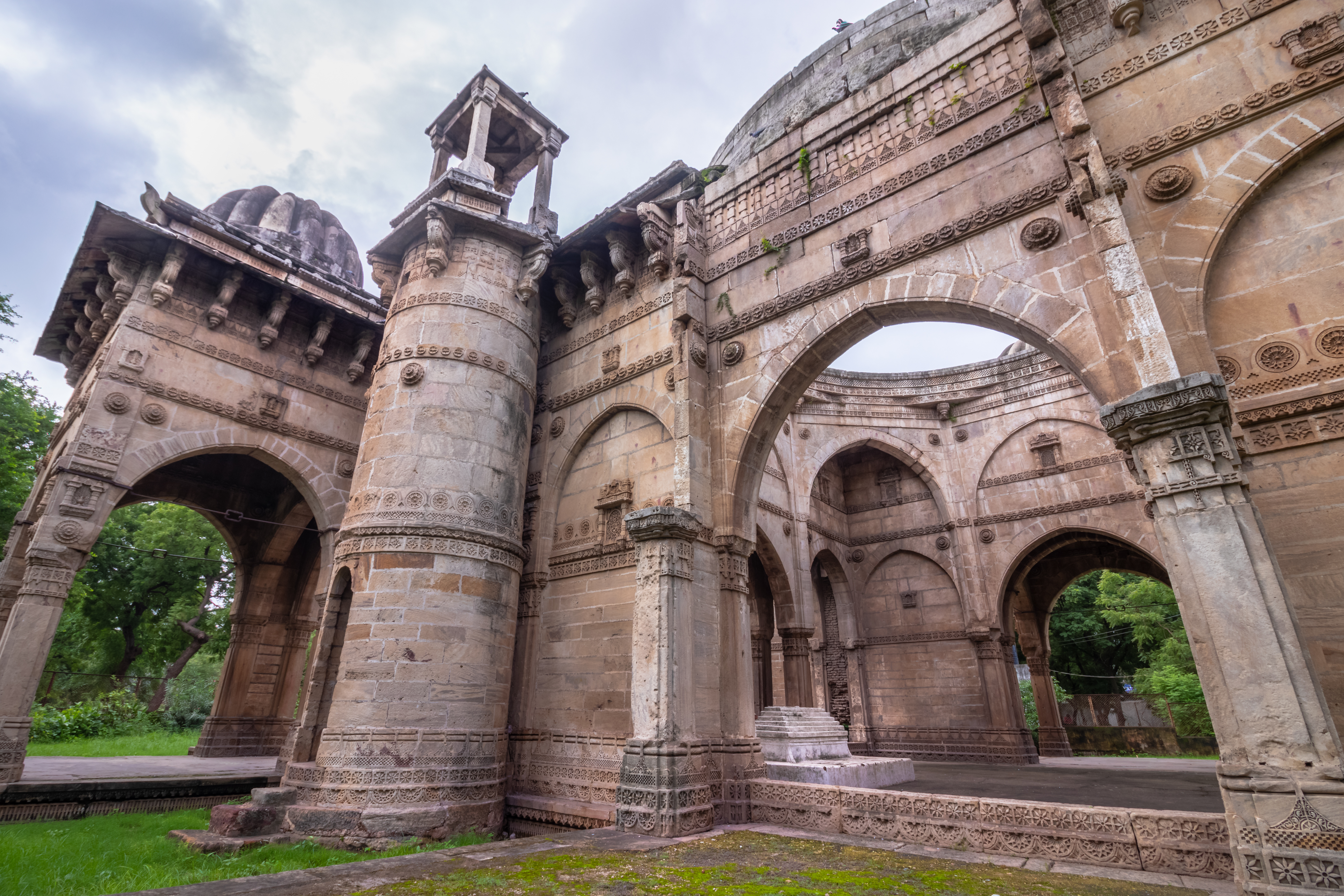
Tomb of Sikandar Shah of Gujarat

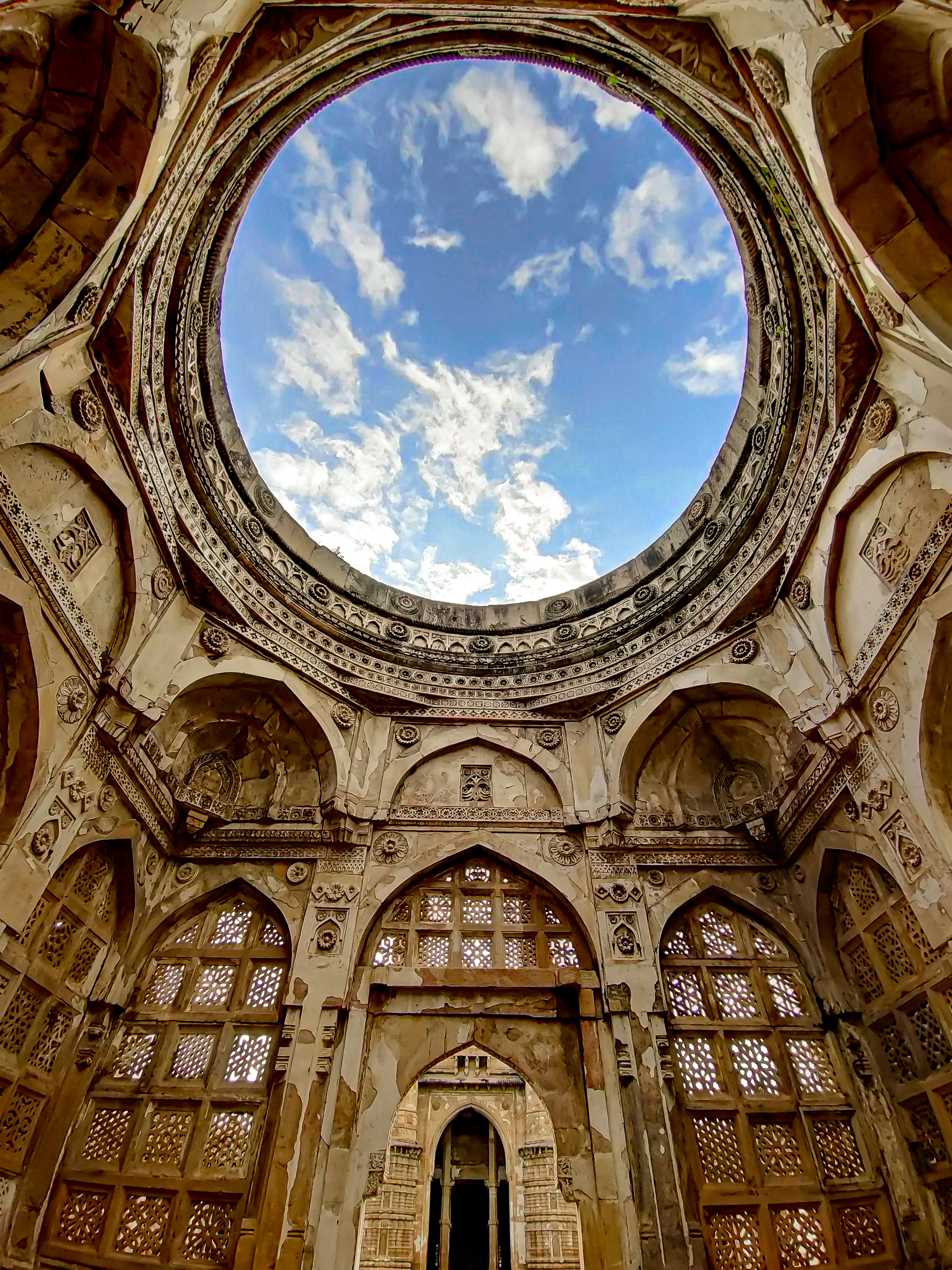
Jami Mosque, Champaner built by Sultan Mahmud Begada
