= Battle of Kapadvanj =

1451 battle part of the Gujarat–Malwa Wars

- Part of Gujarat–Malwa Wars
Date	2 April 1451
Location	Kapadvanj, Gujarat 23°01′12″N 73°04′12″E
Result	Gujarat Sultanate victory

Belligerents
Gujarat Sultanate	Malwa Sultanate

Commanders and leaders
Ahmad Shah II; Dilawar Khan; Malik Nizam; Malik Munir Wazir; Mitha Khan; Zia-ul-Mulk; Tughan Shah Khatri; Sikandar Khan; Malik Halim A'zam Khan; Qadar Khan; Malik Ala-ud-din Suhrab	Mahmud Khalji; Ghiyath Shah; Fidan Khan; Muzaffar Khan †; Mushir-ul-Mulk; Ganga Das

Strength
40,000 cavalry	Unknown

Casualties and losses
Heavy	Heavy; 81 elephants captured
- Location within Gujarat Battle of Kapadvanj (India)

The Battle of Kapadvanj was fought on 2 April 1451 near Kapadvanj in present-day Gujarat between the invading forces of the Malwa Sultanate under Mahmud Khalji and the Gujarat Sultanate led by Ahmad Shah II. The battle ended in a decisive victory for Gujarat, forcing Mahmud Khalji into a humiliating retreat.

In early 1451 Mahmud Khalji invaded Gujarat with a large army of approximately 100,000 cavalry and 500 elephants. After initial successes, the two armies met near the Mahi River. Despite launching a strong initial charge that temporarily routed the Gujarati right wing, Mahmud's forces suffered a major reversal due to the death of key commander Muzaffar Khan and the treachery of senior noble Nizam-ul-Mulk. Ahmad Shah II exploited the situation with a counter-attack, leading to the collapse of the Malwa army. Mahmud escaped with only a handful of men, losing most of his baggage and many elephants.

== Background ==
In 1450–51, Rai Ganga Das of Champaner appealed to Sultan Mahmud Khalji (r. 1436–1469) for help against Muhammad Shah (r. 1442–1451) of Gujarat. Muhammad Shah defeated Ganga Das and besieged Champaner. Mahmud marched into Gujarat threatening its capital Ahmedabad. This forced Muhammad Shah to lift the siege and rush back to Ahmedabad. Mahmud encamped on the Mahi River, where Ganga Das offered tribute. Believing Gujarat weak, Mahmud invaded south-east Gujarat in January 1451 with 100,000 cavalry and 500 elephants. He besieged Sultanpur (in Nandurbar), where after seven days Malik Ala-ud-din Suhrab surrendered on the persuasion of Mubarak Khan brother of Muhammad Shah, who had defected to Mahmud Khalji. Mahmud accepted Ala-ud-din Suhrab in service. Meanwhile the newly crowned sultan, Muhammad Shah had succeeded by Ahmad Shah II. He advanced against the invading army with 40,000 cavalry. Ahmad Shah encamped Wakaner Khanpur on the bank of the Mahi at Baroda. Ganga Das and others joined the camp of Mahmud at Baroda. He warned the Sultan that crossing the Mahi would be difficult and risky without boats, as Ahmad Shah was stationed on the opposite bank. Sultan Mahmud therefore moved further north and crossed the river near Kaparbanj. He left Malik Ala-ud-din Suhrab and some troops behind. He took the opportunity to defect. Ala-ud-din crossed the river at Thanesar and joined the Gujarati camp. Knowing Mahmud's plans, Ala-ud-din immediately informed Ahmad Shah that the Malwa forces were advancing via Kaparbanj. Ahmad Shah then left Wakaner Khanpur and marched towards Kaparbanj, pitching his tents at Khanpur, just six miles away.

== Battle ==
After camping for a few days, Mahmud Khalji launched a night attack on the last day of Safar corresponding to 1 April 1451. However, the guides lost their way, and Mahmud rode on horseback all night, moving from place to place, but failed to reach Ahmad Shah's camp. He returned to his camp and arranged his army for battle. He took command of the center. On the right wing, the Sarangpur army was placed under the command of Prince Ghiyath-ud-din. The left wing was led by the Chanderi army under his second son, Fidan Khan. The battle arrangements were supported by an advanced guard. Sultan Qutb-ud-din arranged his army in the similar formation. He placed the right wing, supported by elephants, under Dilawar Khan, the left under Malik Nizam Mukhlis-ul-Mulk, and kept the stronger centre under his own command. The centre included prominent nobles such as Khan-i-Jahan Malik Munir Wazir, Mitha Khan, Zia-ul-Mulk, Tughan Shah Khatri, Sikandar Khan, Malik Halim A'zam Khan and Qadar Khan. The direction of the advance guard was left to Dilawar Khan. Muzaffar Khan charged the left wing completely pushing the right wing of the Gujarat army back all the way to their centre. Muzaffar Khan's men captured a large amount of booty during this successful assault. They carried off Ahmad Shah's pavilion, crown and jewelled girdle. While returning he was attacked by Ikhtiyar-ul-Mulk the commander of the right wing. Muzaffar Khan was dismounted and killed on the battlefield. The Gujarati forces then attacked the centre of the Malwa army. Mahmud Khalji tried to resist but in vain. The soldiers fell into confusion, scattered, and fled the battlefield. While the Sultan was trying to rally and reassemble his dispersed forces, treachery struck from within his own camp. Mushir-ul-Mulk, entitled Nizam-ul-Mulk secretly colluded with the Gujarati Sultan Ahmad Shah and immediately informed him of the confusion and weakness that had appeared in the Malwese centre. He also withdrew from the battlefield. Ahmad Shah who was lying in ambush, immediately launched a fierce charge and inflicted heavy damage on the Malwese centre. Sultan Mahmud fought back as his men continued to flee, he was eventually left with only twenty-two soldiers and began to withdraw towards his camp. Nizam-ul-Mulk further worsened the situation by spreading the false rumour that the Sultan had been killed. This demoralized the reinforcements that were coming to Mahmud's aid. Nevertheless, the Sultan, along with his small band of twenty-two loyal soldiers, slowly fought his way back. By the time he reached his tent, only thirteen soldiers remained with him. The Gujarat army captured 81 elephants and all his baggage.

== Aftermath ==
He waited until 5,000 to 6,000 of his scattered men had rejoined him, then began a midnight retreat toward Shadiabad. Along the way, the Kolis harassed his force and inflicted heavy losses. After his return from Gujarat, Sultan Mahmud was greatly troubled by the defeat and suffered from mental agony. To restore his prestige, he dispatched Prince Ghiyath Shah to raid the port town of Surat. Ghiyath Shah attacked and plundered the suburbs of Surat and Rander before returning to Shadiabad with considerable booty.

== See also ==
- Battle of Maheskar
- Konkan War
- Malwa–Bahmani Wars
- Gujarati–Portuguese conflicts

== Bibliography ==
- Day, Upendra Nath (1965). Medieval Malwa: A Political and Cultural History, 1401-1562. Munshi Ram Manohar Lal. ISBN 978-81-215-0401-0.
- Haig, W. (1928). The Cambridge History of India: Turks and Afghans, edited by W. Haig. Vol. III. Cambridge University Press.
- Habib, Mohammad; Nizami, Khaliq Ahmad, eds. (1970). A Comprehensive History of India: The Delhi Sultanat (A.D. 1206-1526). Vol. V. People's Publishing House.
- Dosabhai, Edalji (1986) [1894]. A History of Gujarat (PDF). Kessinger Publishing. ISBN 978-1-4367-3303-8.
- Commissariat, M. S. (1938). A History of Gujarat. Vol. I. Ahmadabad: Longmans Green & Co. Ltd.
