= Nandod Assembly constituency =

Legislative Assembly constituency in Gujarat State, India

Coordinates: 21.87°N 73.5°E

Nandod
- Constituency No. 148 for the Gujarat Legislative Assembly

Constituency details
- Country: India
- Region: Western India
- State: Gujarat
- District: Narmada
- Lok Sabha constituency: Chhota Udaipur
- Established: 2008
- Total electors: 235,260
- Reservation: ST

Member of Legislative Assembly
- 15th Gujarat Legislative Assembly
- Incumbent Dr. Darshna Chandubhai Deshmukh(vasava)
- Party: Bharatiya Janata Party
- Elected year: 2022

Nandod is one of the 182 Legislative Assembly constituencies of Gujarat state in India. It is part of Narmada district and is reserved for candidates belonging to the Scheduled Tribes. The seat came into existence due to the delimitation exercise in 2008 and it is a part of the Chhota Udaipur Lok Sabha constituency.

== Segments ==
This assembly seat represents the following segments

1. Nandod Taluka – entire taluka except Dhefa village
2. Tilakwada Taluka

== Members of Legislative Assembly ==
Year	Member	Picture	Party
2012	Shabdarshan Tadvi		Bharatiya Janata Party
2017	Vasava Premsinhbhai Devjibhai		Indian National Congress
2022	Dr. Darshna Vasava		Bharatiya Janata Party

== Election results ==
=== 2022 ===
Gujarat Assembly election, 2022: Assembly constituency
Party	Candidate	Votes	%	±%
BJP	Darshna Vasava	70543	39.74	
INC	Hareshbhai Jayantibhai Vasava	42341	23.85	
Independent	Harshadbhai Chunilal Vasava	35362	19.92	
AAP	Dr. Prafulbhai Devjibhai Vasava	24463	13.78	
NOTA	None of the above	3104	1.75	
Majority			15.89	
Turnout				
Registered electors		231,615		
BJP gain from INC		Swing		

=== 2017 ===
Gujarat Legislative Assembly Election, 2017: Nandod
Party	Candidate	Votes	%	±%
INC	Premsinhbhai Vasava	81,849	48.64	
BJP	Shabdarshan Tadvi	75,520	44.88	
JD(U)	Jesingbhai Tadvi	2,329	1.38	
Majority		6,329	3.76	
Turnout		1,68,277	76.42	
Registered electors		220,199		
INC gain from BJP		Swing		

=== 2012 ===
Gujarat Assembly Election, 2012
Party	Candidate	Votes	%	±%
BJP	Shabdarshan Tadvi	79580	50.14	
INC	Hareshbhai Vasava	63853	40.23	
Majority		15727	9.91	
Turnout		158709	78.25	
BJP win (new seat)				

== See also ==
- List of constituencies of Gujarat Legislative Assembly
- Gujarat Legislative Assembly
