= Kamboi =

Town in Patan, Gujarat, India

Coordinates: 23.68°N 72.02°E

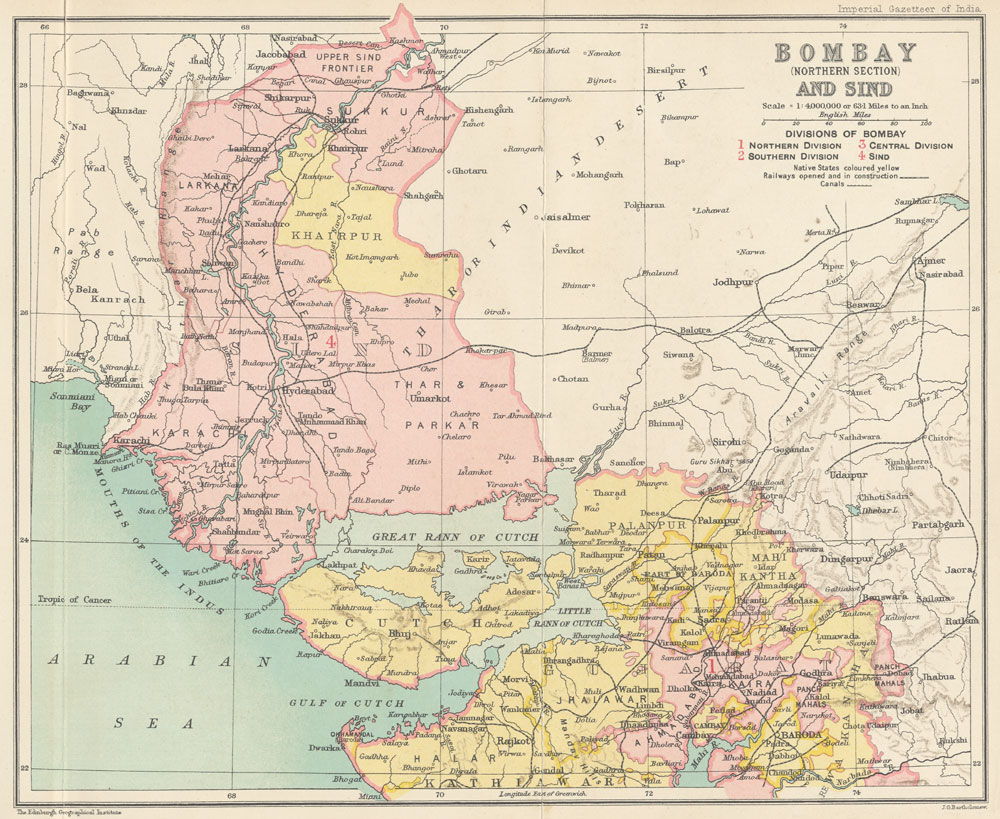
Bombay Presidency, 1909, northern portion

Kamboi is a town located in Chanasma taluka, in Patan district, in the modern Indian state of Gujarat. It is 10 kilometres (6.2 mi) west of Chanasma on the Harij-Mehsana road. It uses the postcode number of 384230.

== History ==
Historian R. C. Majumdar describes Kamboi as being about 20 kilometres (12 mi) west of Anahilwara Patan. It was the site of a decisive victory in 1392 over Farhat-ul-Mulk by Zaffar Khan, who later founded the Muzaffarid dynasty.

== Etymology ==
Kamboika is stated to have been evolved from the Pali Kambojaka or Kambojika as follows:

Kambojika == > Kamboyika == > Kamboika since hard palatal j is known to change to soft y in Indo-Aryan languages and further yi == > i.

The change of palatal j to soft y is not unusual. The Shabazgarhi Inscriptions of king Ashoka also write Kamboja as Kamboya where j is replaced with y.)

To give a few more illustrations, the terms SamJogita, SamaJa, Jajman, Jadu, Jogi and GaJni etc. are also found written as SamYokita, SamaYa Yajman Yadu, Yogi and GaYni where also the j has become soft y.

And lastly, the penultimate letter k being sandwiched between two vowels gets eliminated in ancient Indo-Aryan languages following a documented procedure as noted by ancient Prakritic Grammarians. According to third century Prakritic grammarian Acharya Varuchi, the consonants k, g, ch, j, t, d, p etc. falling between two vowel sounds usually get elited.

Hence KamboiKa == > Kamboi

Thus, the 15th-century records refer to this town as Kamboi.

== Tourism ==
=== Jain tirtha ===
The Kamboi town has an old Jain tirtha (pilgrim place) at its centre. The moolnayak of this temple is a 2.5 feet (0.76 m) white-coloured idol of Bhagawan Manamohan Parshvanath in the Padmasana posture. The idol dates back to King Samprati’s period (224 – 215 BCE). Other idols in the temple have inscriptions dating back to the 16th century. The temple was renovated in 2003.

There is also an old temple to Siyojmata, a goddess of the town.

== Land-locked trade port ==
Recent archaeological excavations have discovered that even though land-locked now, the Kamboi and Kambay had been once well known sea ports on the western coast of Gujarat. Similarly also, there was a port named Gandhar in Taluka Bhroach (ancient Bharukachcha) contiguous to Narbada. This information furnished is not related to Kamboi of Chanasma taluka but it looks like the Kamboi of Jambusar taluka of bharuch district.

== See also ==
- Kamboja-Dvaravati Route
- Kambojas
- Kumbhoj

== Notes and references ==
=== References ===
- Hindu Polity, A Constitutional History of India in Hindu Times, Part I & II, 1978, Dr K. P. Jayswal
- Majumdar, Ramesh Chandra; Pusalker, A. D.; Majumdar, A. K., eds. (1960). The History and Culture of the Indian People. Vol. VI: The Delhi Sultanate. Bombay: Bharatiya Vidya Bhavan.
- The Sind, M. C. Lambrick
- Epigraphia Indica, Vol XXIV, pp 45–46
- "Shri Kamboi Teerth"
