= Jama Mosque, Ahmedabad =

Mosque in Ahmedabad, Gujarat, India

Jama Mosque
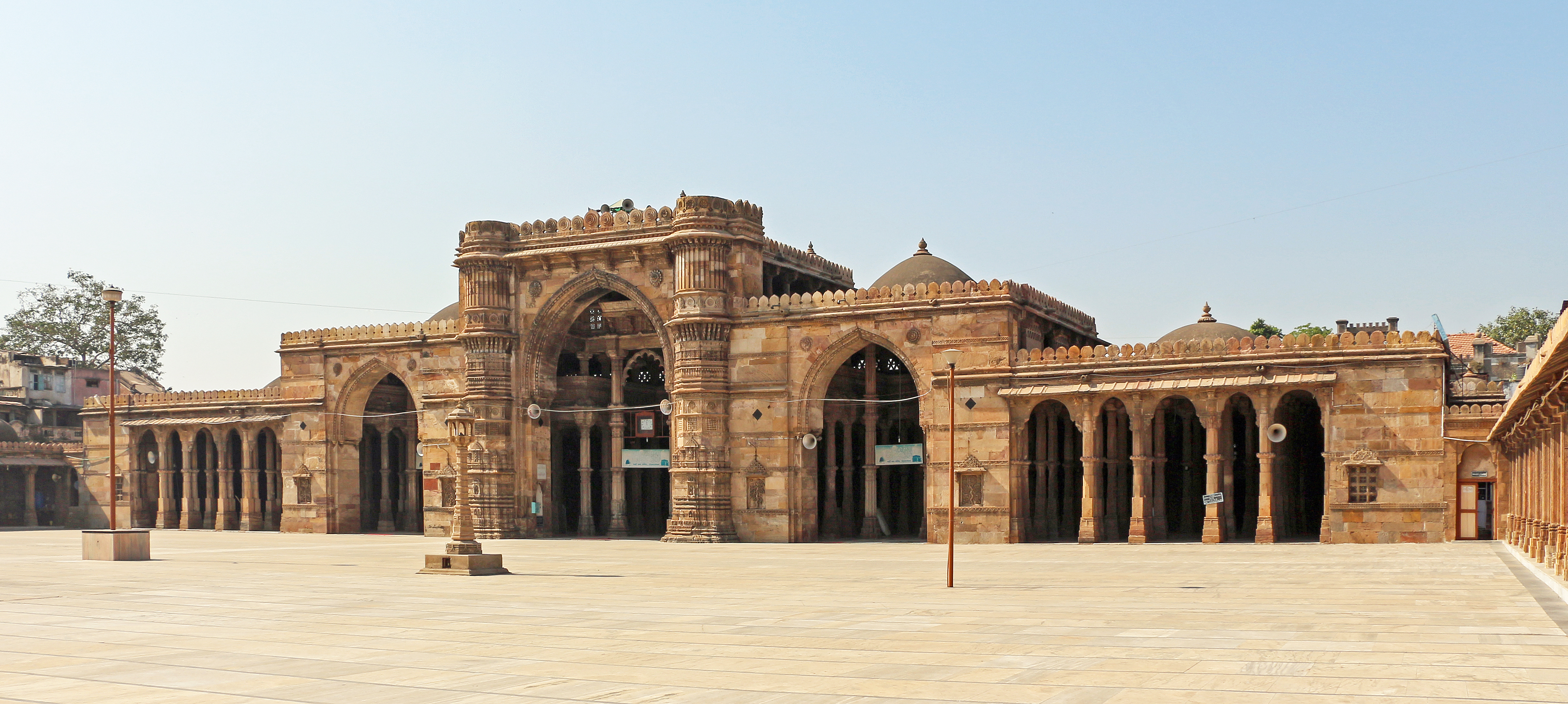
- The mosque and courtyard in 2013

- Location of the mosque in Ahmedabad

Religion
- Affiliation: Islam
- Ecclesiastical or organisational status: Mosque
- Status: Active

Location
- Location: Old Ahmedabad, Gujarat
- Country: India
- Coordinates: 23°01′26″N 72°35′14″E

Architecture
- Type: Mosque architecture
- Style: Indo-Islamic Gujarat style
- Founder: Ahmed Shah I
- Groundbreaking: 1212
- Completed: 4 January 1424

Specifications
- Dome: 15
- Minaret: Two (since damaged)
- Materials: Yellow sandstone

Monument of National Importance
- Official name: Jama Masjid
- Reference no.: N-GJ-7

The Jama Masjid (literally Friday Mosque), also known as Jumah Mosque or Jami' Masjid, is a Friday mosque located in Ahmedabad, Gujarat, India. It was built in 1424 during the reign of Ahmad Shah I. The inscription on the central mihrab commemorates the inauguration of the mosque in 827 AH (1423/1424 CE), on the 1st Sarar, or January 4, by Sultan Ahmad Shah I. The mosque lies in the old walled city, and it is situated outside Bhadra Fort area. The old walled city is divided into separate quarters or pols, and the Jami' Masjid is found on the Gandhi Road. Along the south side of the road, the mosque is a short distance beyond the Teen Darwaza or Tripolia Gate. The structure is a Monument of National Importance.

The Jama Masjid was the fifth mosque structure built during Ahmed Shah I's reign. Earlier mosques had either been modest in size or intended for private use. The Jama Masjid differed significantly from its predecessors in that it was a large, grandiose structure. The mosque complex has a large paved courtyard that can be entered from three different directions. The courtyard has an ablution tank in the middle. The prayer hall is located on the west side of the building. The entire mosque is emblematic of what came to be known as Gujarat style architecture.

== Location ==
The Jama Masjid of Ahmedabad was probably the largest mosque in the Indian subcontinent built in this period. It lies in the centre of the old walled city. The northern wall of the mosque lies along a processional way. Designed as part of a major plan desired by Sultan Ahmed Shah I, the mosque is located north of the processional axis that runs from the Maidan-i Shah at the door with three arches, Teen Darwaza. One enters the mosque from the north using a staircase. To the east of the mosque is the Badshah-ka-Hazira, also known as the Tomb of Ahmad Shah. This is the tomb of Ahmad Shah I, his son, and grandson. The tomb used similar architectural styles as the Jama Mosque even though it was started after the completion of the mosque. Some similar architectural features include the use of multiple domes, enclosed columned courts, and pierced screen walls. Although the tomb did not use any novel architectural features, it was the first of its kind in Ahmedabad. Nearby are the graves of the queens and other wives of Sultan Ahmad Shah I, which is called the Rani no Hajiro or Hazira. This tomb used a similar architectural style to the Tomb of Ahmad Shah.

== History ==
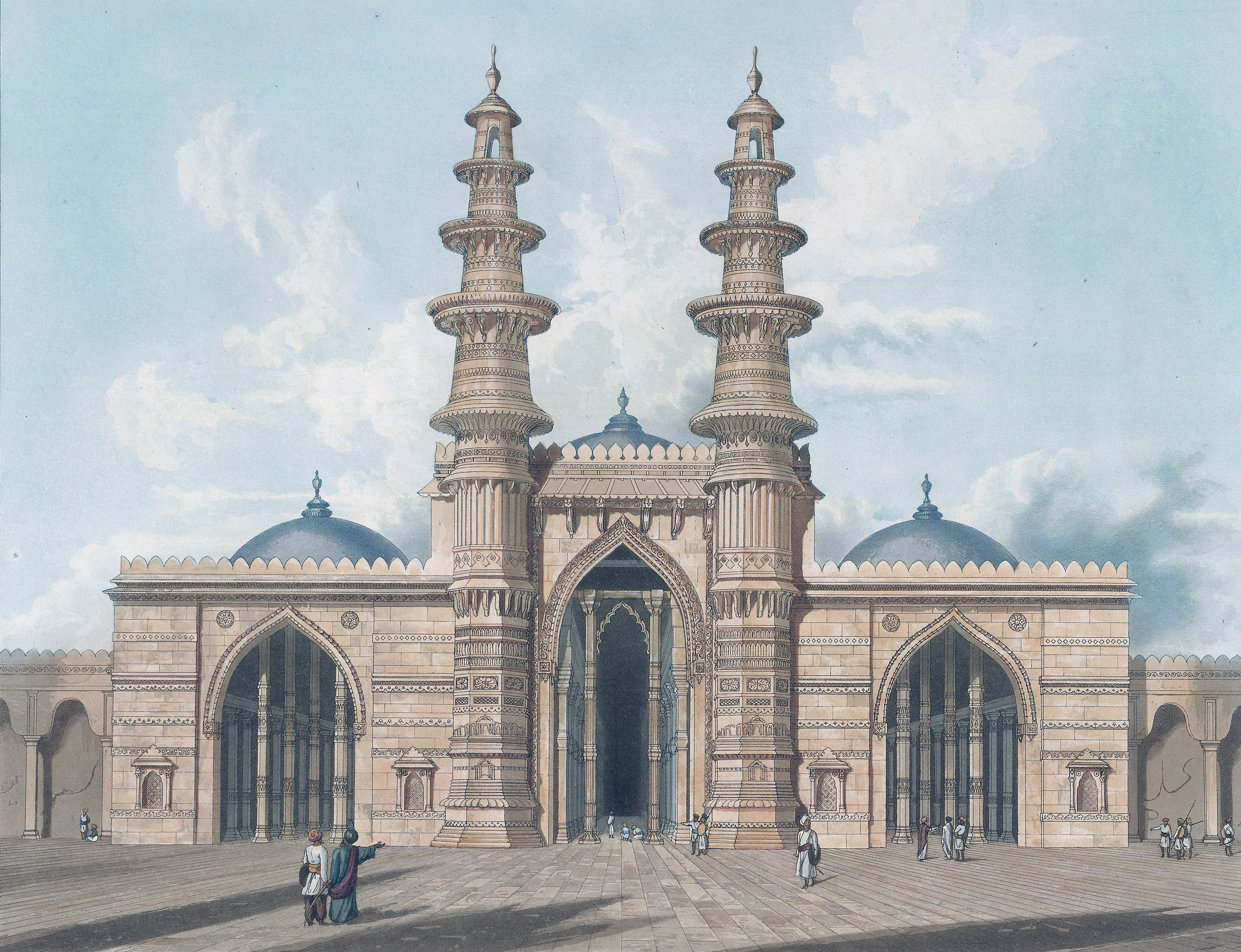
Jama Masjid with minarets, drawn in 1809 by Robert Melville Grindlay

In recent years, local officials have struggled with balancing the preservation of the mosque's original elements, while also maintaining the structure so it is still serviceable for worshipping population. The Sunni Muslim Waqf Committee has replaced the original sandstone flooring of the mosque's courtyard with marble flooring. The hauj (tank) in the middle of the mosque's courtyard, which worshippers use to perform the act of Wudu before prayer, has also been relaid. Iron frames were fixed to the windows. The Archeological Society of India has filed multiple complaints in court against members of the Sunni Muslim Waqf Committee and locals for violating the Archaeological Monuments and Archaeological Sites Remains Act. The Sunni Muslim Waqf Committee has said, "'The ASI has neither the resources nor will to arrest the decay. Most of these monuments, especially the mosques, are still used. When the ASI fails to repair a crumbling monument, the onus of doing the job falls on us. We can't run away from providing basic amenities to people who come to pray" concerning the claims made by the ASI.

== Architecture ==
Ahmedabad was founded on 26 February 1411, far from the Muslim rule in Delhi. This allowed for Ahmedabad to develop its own provincial style of architecture. Ahmedabad's provincial style of architecture is commonly named Gujarat style, in accordance to the name of the province. The Gujarat style of architecture, and thus Ahmedabad's style of architecture, is a mix of Indo-Islamic and traditional Hindu temple architectural elements. Although the Gujarat style flourished during the 15th century and afterwards, the Māru-Gurjara style, from the 11th to 13th centuries, was a precedent for the Gujarat Islamic architecture style since Islam had been present in Gujarat a century before Ahmed Shah I rose to power and founded Ahmedabad. The early mosques in Gujarat during the pre-Ahmed Shah period were created from mostly pillaged temple material that was turned into mosque-like structures.

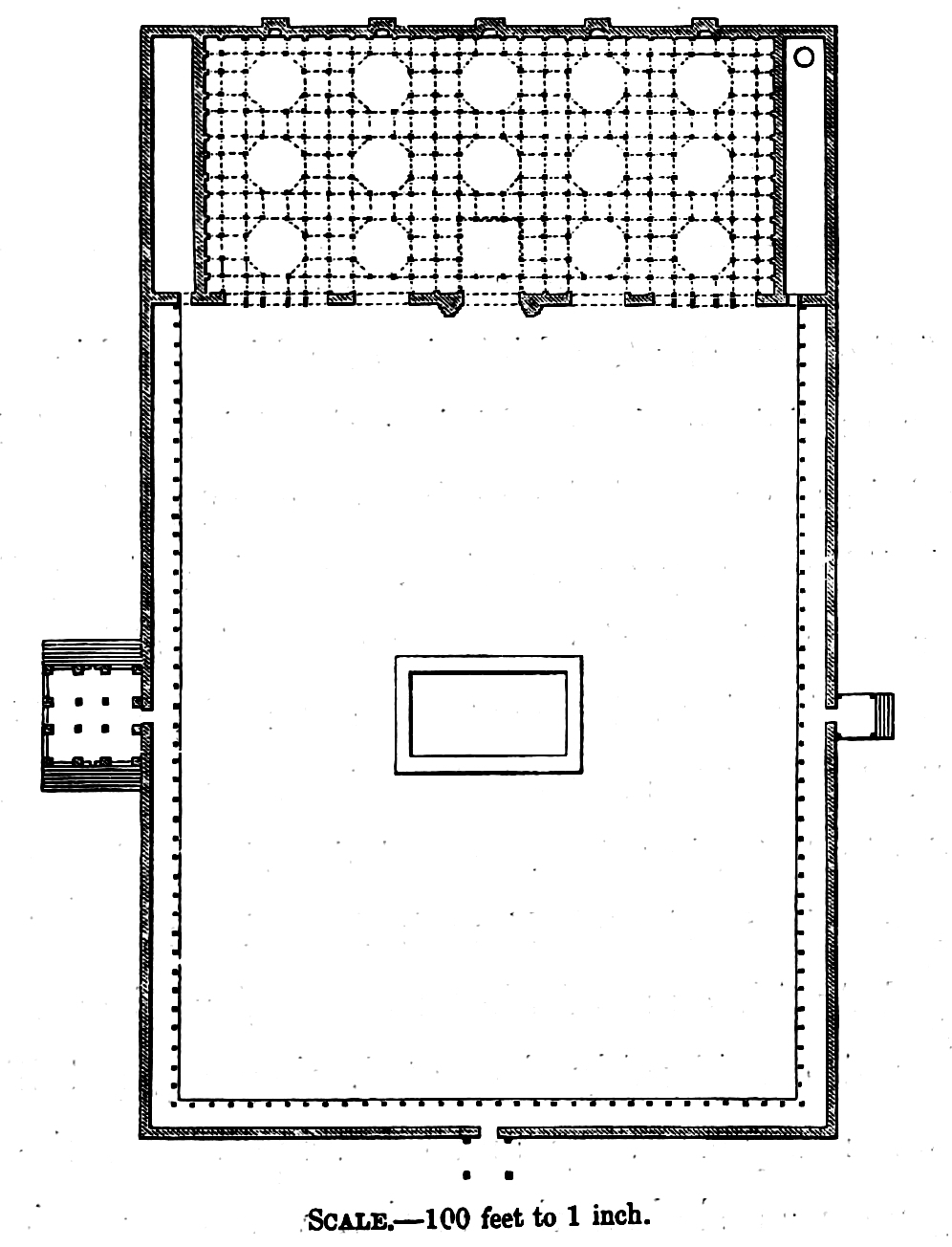
Plan of the mosque. This is a vertical view so the western facing Prayer Hall is pointed north.

The Jama Masjid is one of many examples of the Gujarat style of architecture in Ahmedabad. The monuments in and around the old city fall roughly into two categories. The first category is associated with Ahmad Shah I during the first half of the 15th century and the second being associated with Mahmud Begada for the second half of the 15th century and beyond. Built with yellow sandstone, the mosque complex is centred on a large rectangular courtyard 75 metres (246 ft) long and 66 metres (217 ft) wide. One enters the court by three entrances: south, east, and north. One at the centre of each side. The primary entrance is the south facing entrance; the eastern porched entrance leads out to another enclosure, the tomb of Sultan Ahmad Shah I. The courtyard is lined with a colonnade on three sides, the prayer hall occupies the western side. In the centre of the courtyard is a rectangular basin for ablutions.

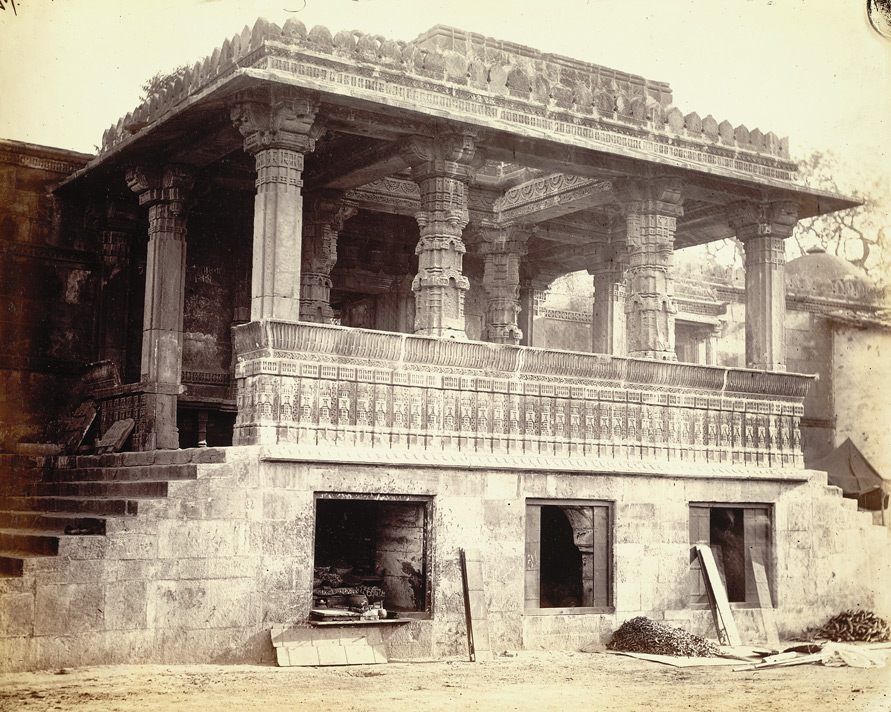
Southern porch and entrance to the Jama Mosque

The southern porch entrance to the mosque is large and supported by pillars, some of which were reused from Hindu or Jain temples. The porch is elavated with twelve steps on each side. It is topped by a roof that once had a dome which has since collapsed.

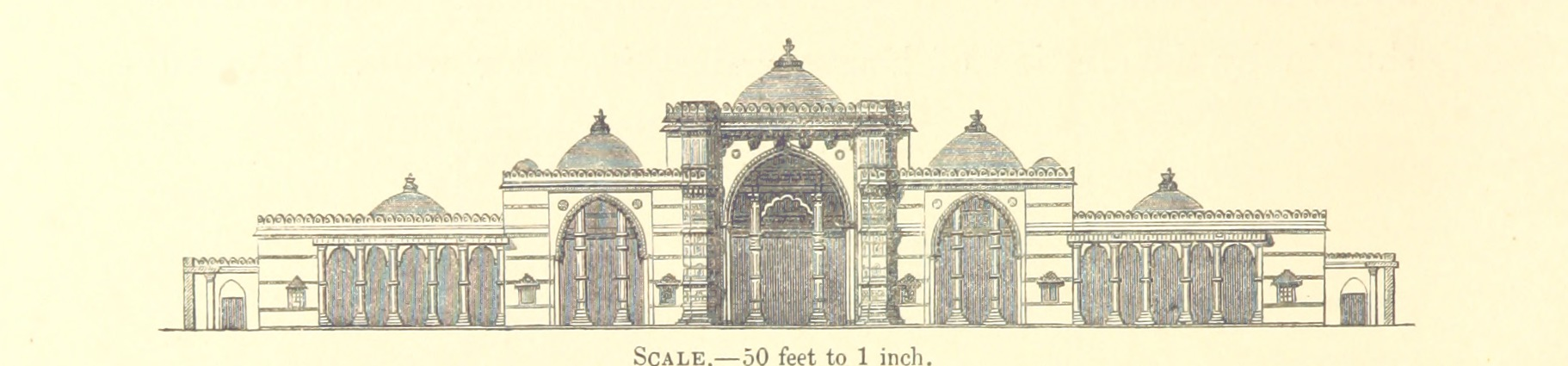
Elevation of the mosque. Viewer can see the three different roof levels.

In its Indo-Muslim architecture, the mosque also contains many syncretic elements not necessarily obvious to the viewer: some of the central domes are carved like lotus flowers, closely related to the typical domes of Jain temples; and some of the pillars are carved with the form of a bell hanging on a chain, in reference to the bells that often hang in Hindu temples.

=== Prayer hall ===
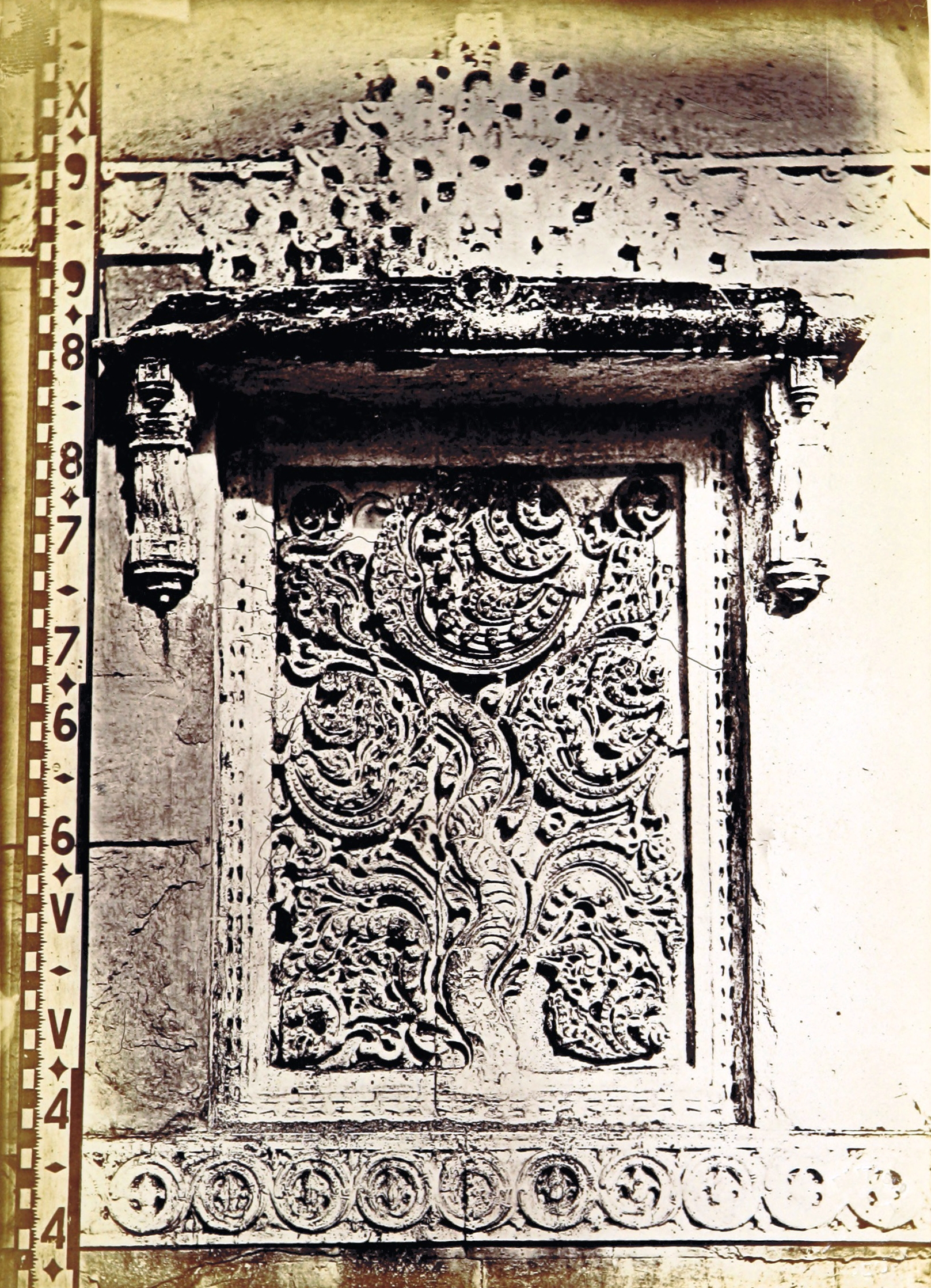
Niche between side-arches

The prayer room is rectangular and covered by fifteen domes. The roof of the prayer room is arranged on three levels. The main prayer hall has about 260 closely set columns supporting the roof, with its 15 domes, making a walk through the hall a beautiful maze of light and shadows. The wide-open courtyard, floored with white marble, is ringed by a colonnade painted with giant Arabic calligraphy, and has a tank for ritual ablutions in the centre. The mosque and arcades are built of yellow sandstone and carved with the intricate detail that mosques of this period are known for. The main prayer hall space is divided into fifteen bays, or three rows of five square bays, each with a dome thus totaling 15 domes. The cupola dome in the centre is higher than the rest. The central nave of the prayer area is three stories tall.

The mosque has, in total, five mihrabs that correspond with the aforementioned five square bays of the main prayer hall. The five mihrabs run along the Qibla wall. The Qibla wall faces the west and is decorated with colored marble together with its mihrabs. A white marble crescent marks the spot where the imam leads the prayer. Pierced stone screens (the 'Jalis') are placed between the two pillars of the central openings.

=== Minarets ===
The main entrance is framed by two columns. They are the remains of two minarets (the 'shaking minarets') destroyed by the earthquakes of 1819 and 1956. In the earthquake of 1819, the lofty minarets were reduced to half their height and became known as the "shaking minarets". The earthquake of 1956 destroyed the remaining "shaking minarets".

== Gallery ==
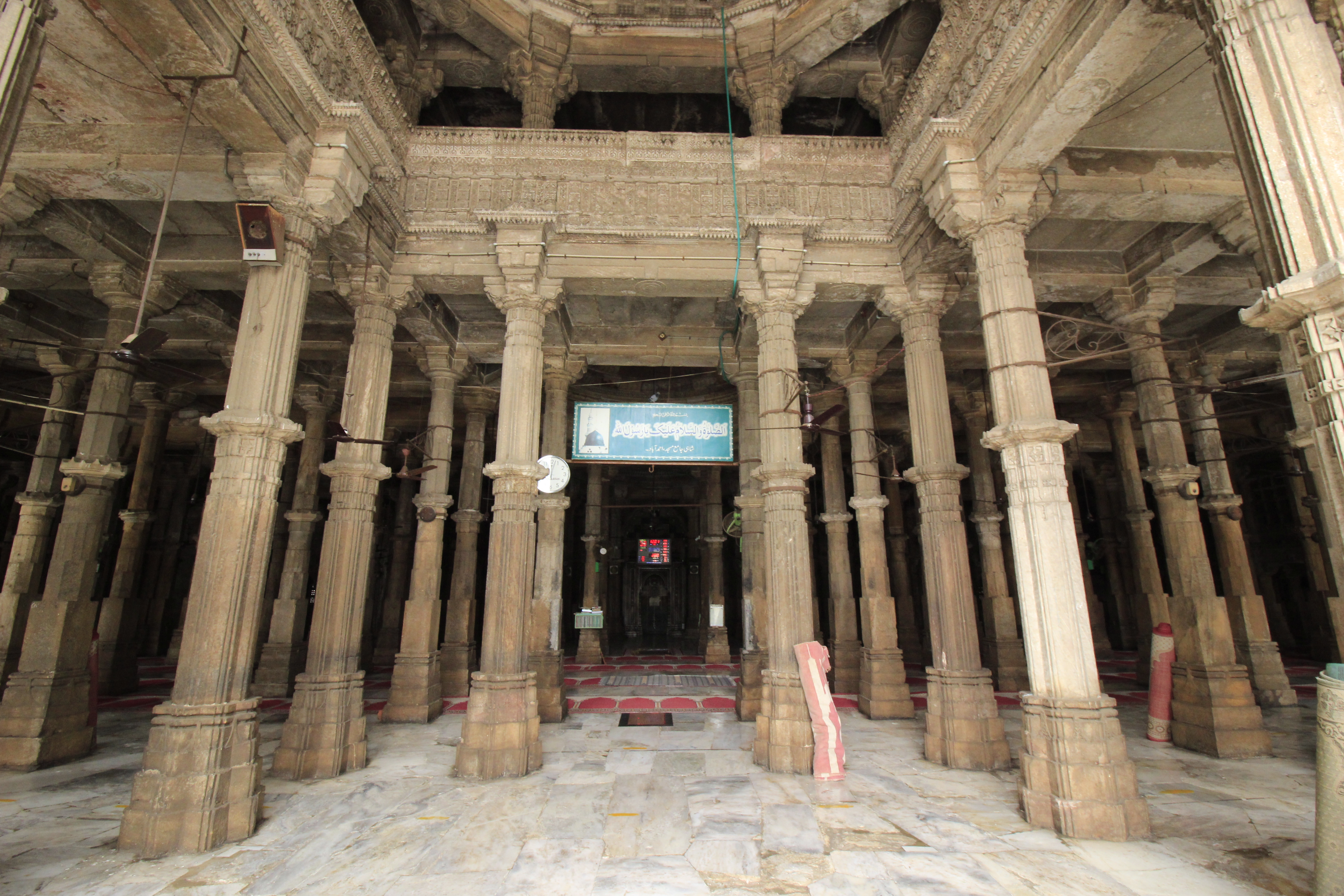
The prayer room

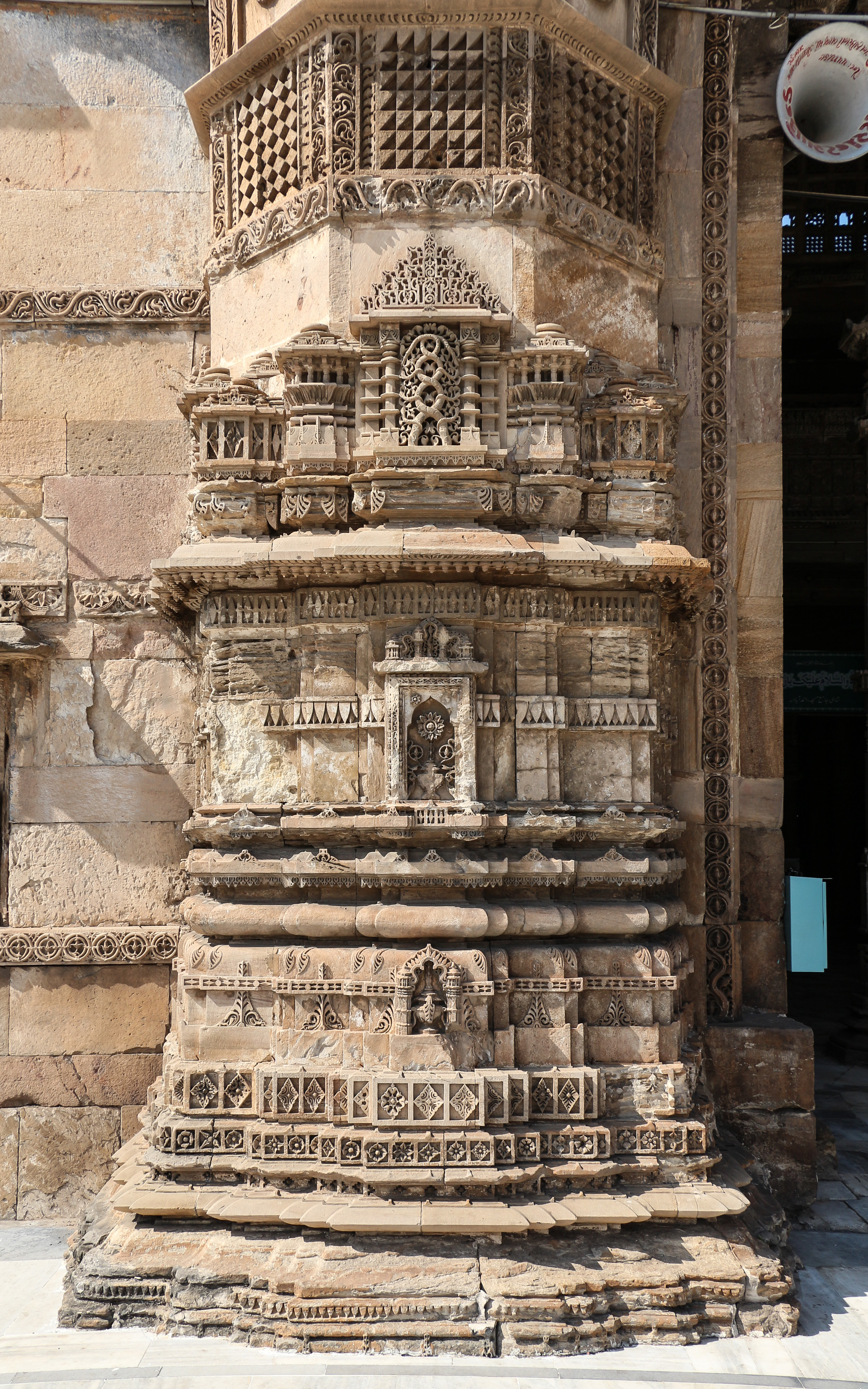
Detail of a minaret

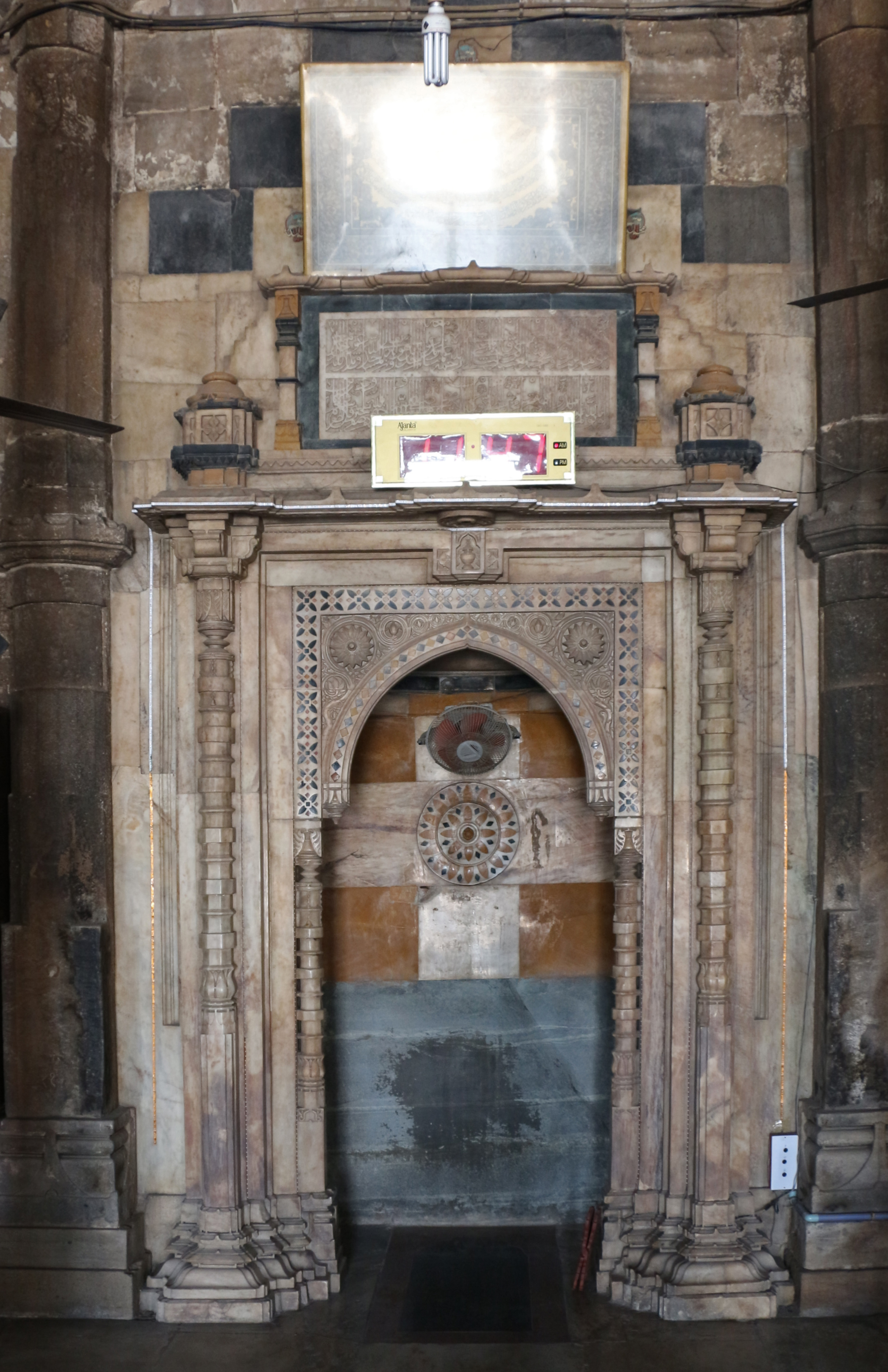
A mihrab in the mosque

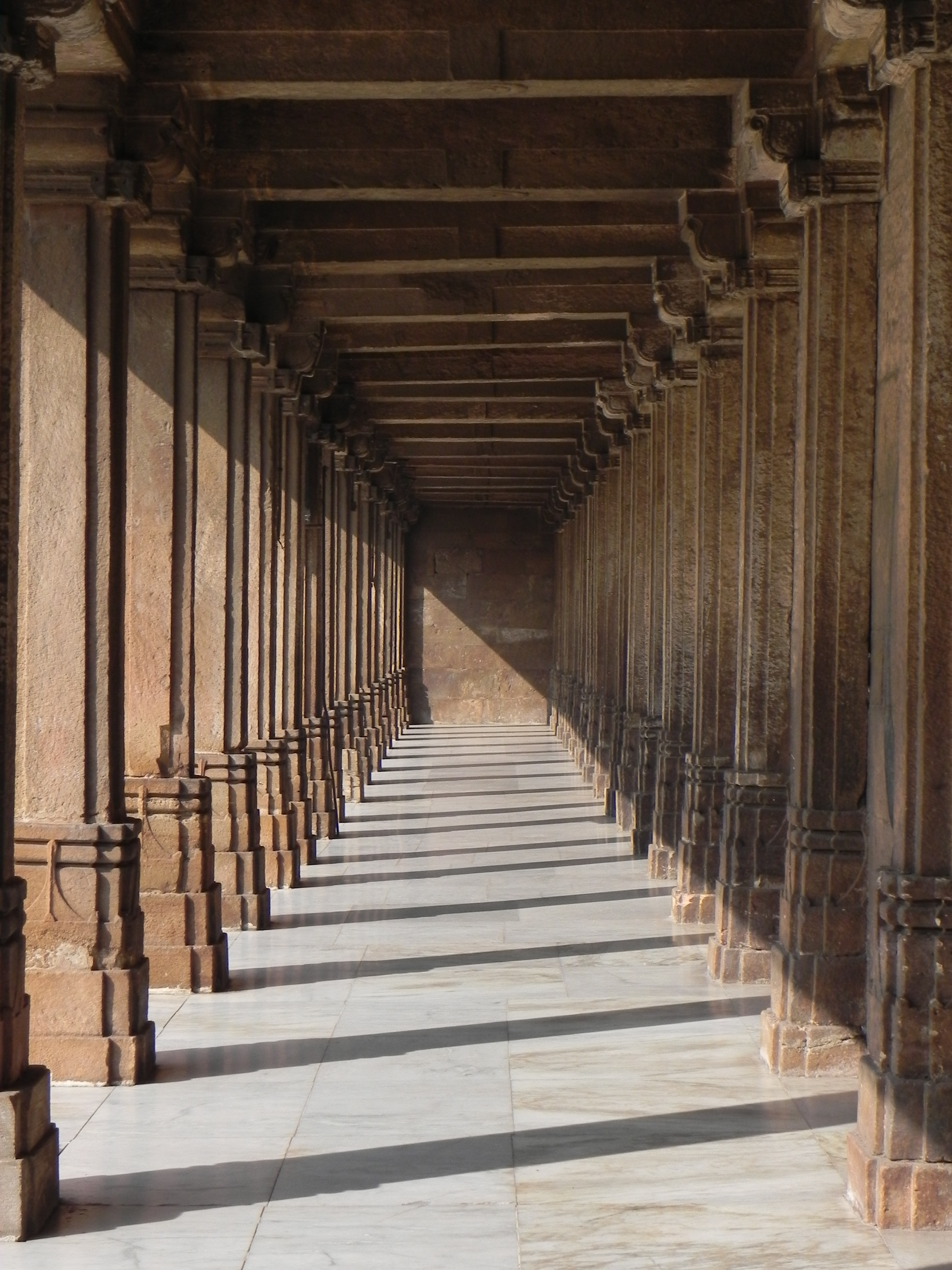
Pillars in periphery of Jama Masjid

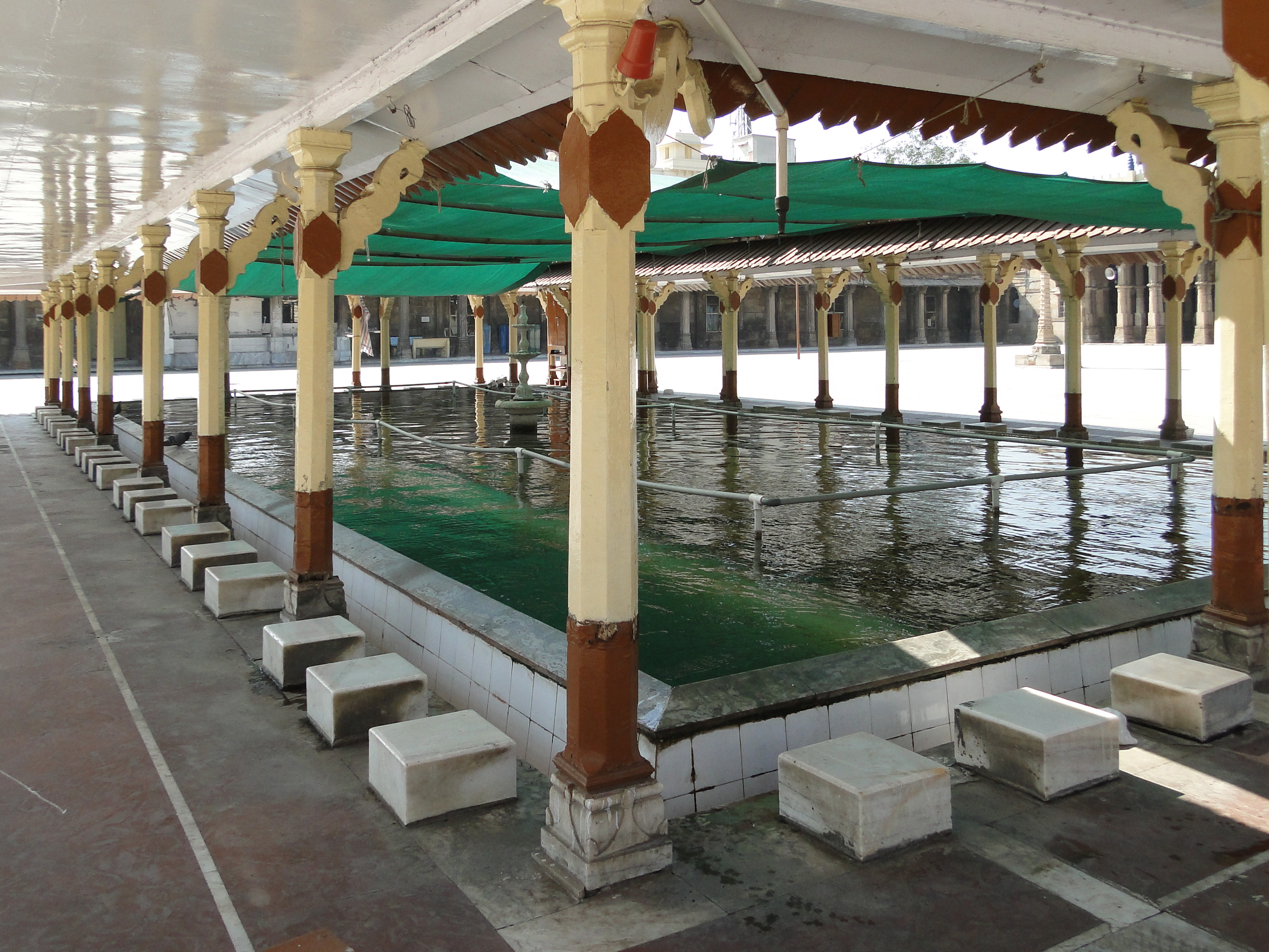
The basin for ablutions

== See also ==
- Islam in India
- List of mosques in India
- List of Monuments of National Importance in Gujarat
