= Ahmad Shah's Tomb =

Medieval mosque and group of tombs in Ahmedabad, India

Ahmed Shah's Tomb
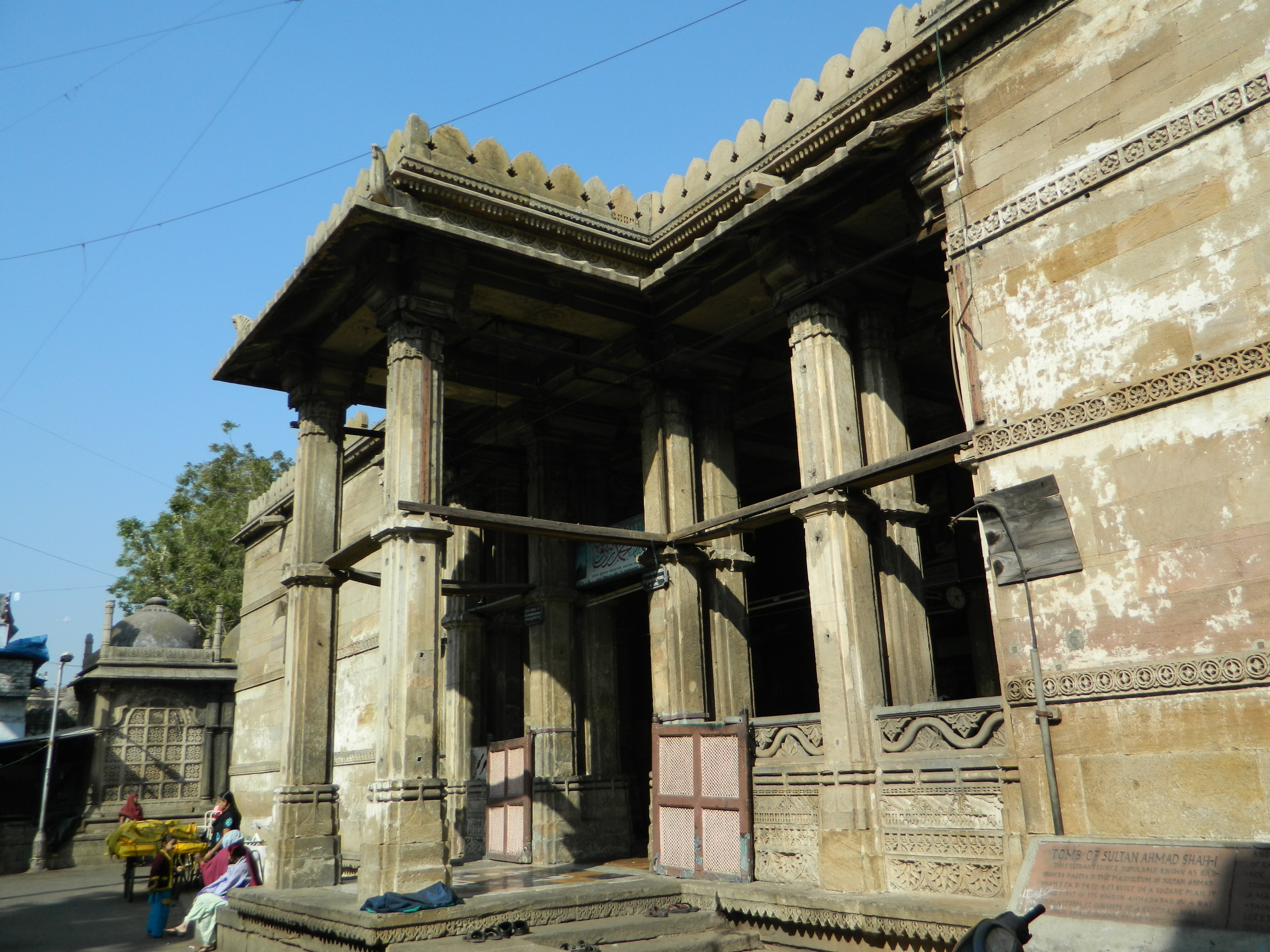

- Location in Ahmedabad, Gujarat, India Ahmad Shah's Tomb (Gujarat)

Religion
- Affiliation: Islam
- Status: Active

Location
- Location: Ahmedabad
- Municipality: Ahmedabad Municipal Corporation
- State: Gujarat
- Coordinates: 23.0239575°N 72.5883574°E

Architecture
- Type: Tomb
- Style: Islamic
- Funded by: Muhhamad Shah
- Dome: 5
- Designated as NHL: National Monument of Importance; ASI Monument No. N-GJ-9

Ahmad Shah's Tomb, locally known as Badshah no Hajiro or Raja no Hajiro (King's Mausoleum), is a medieval mosque and the group of tombs in Ahmedabad, India. Ahmad Shah's tomb is situated close to Jama Mosque and Manek Chowk.

== History ==
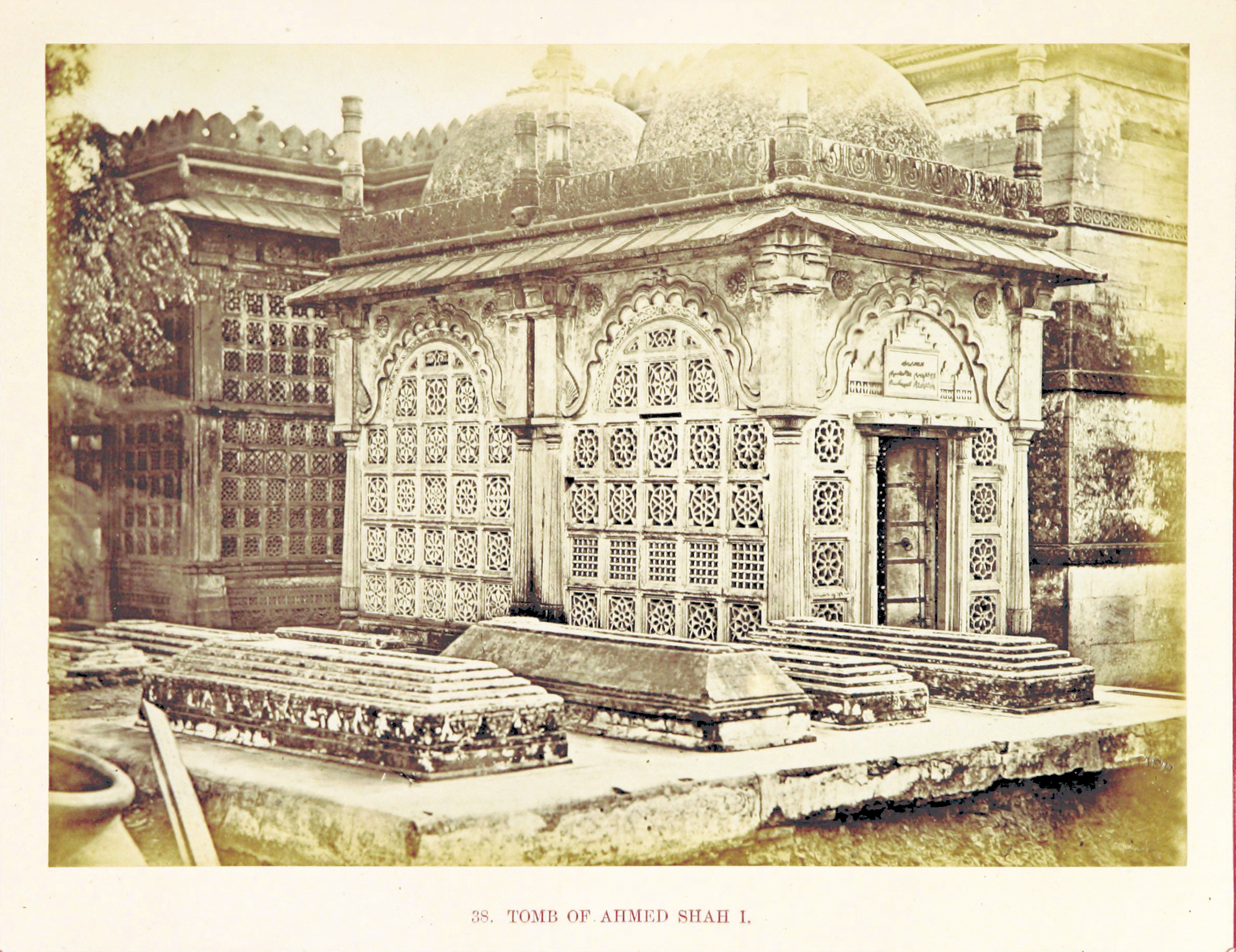
Ahmed Shah's Tomb in 1860s

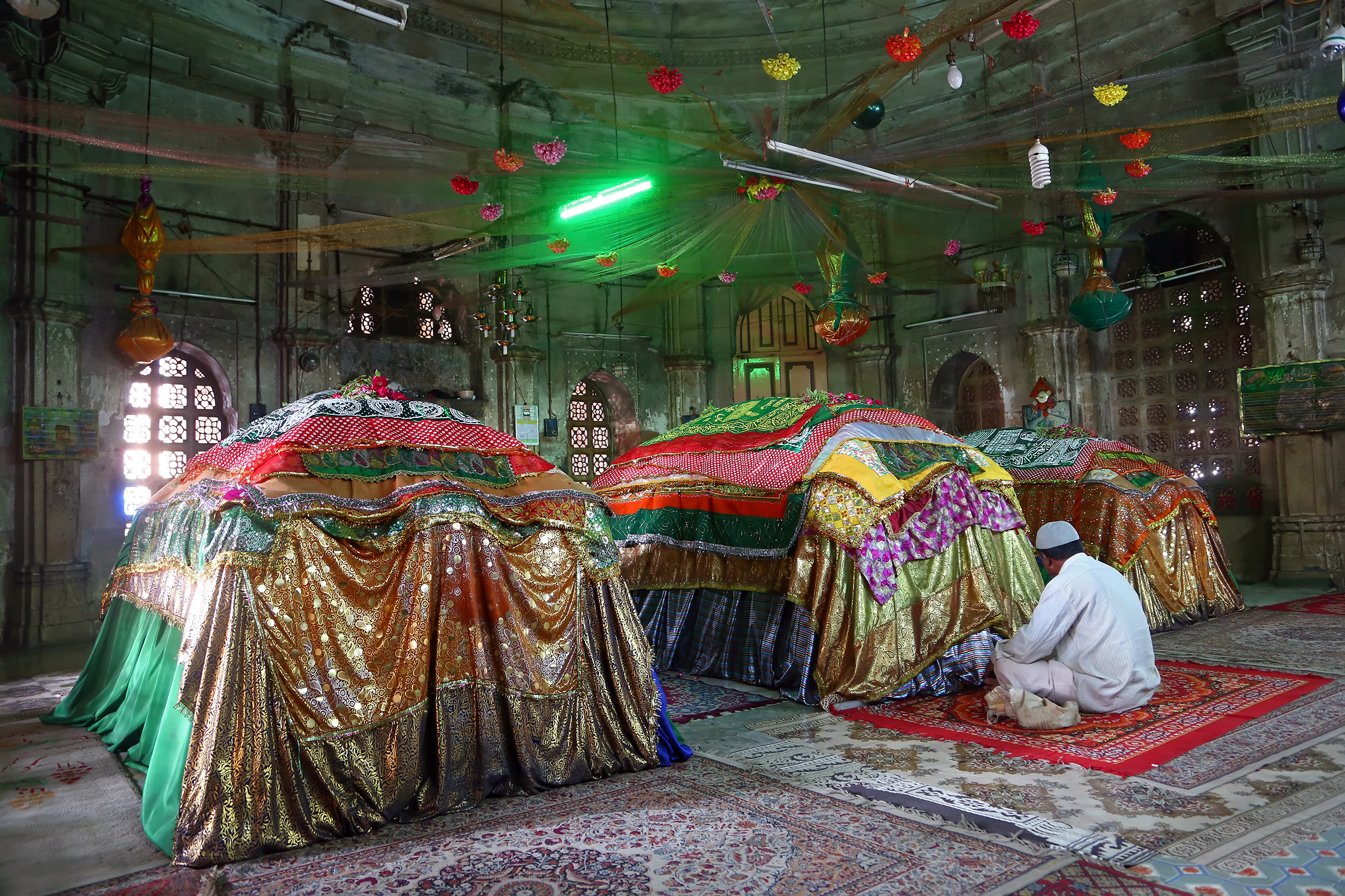
Tomb of Ahmad Shah

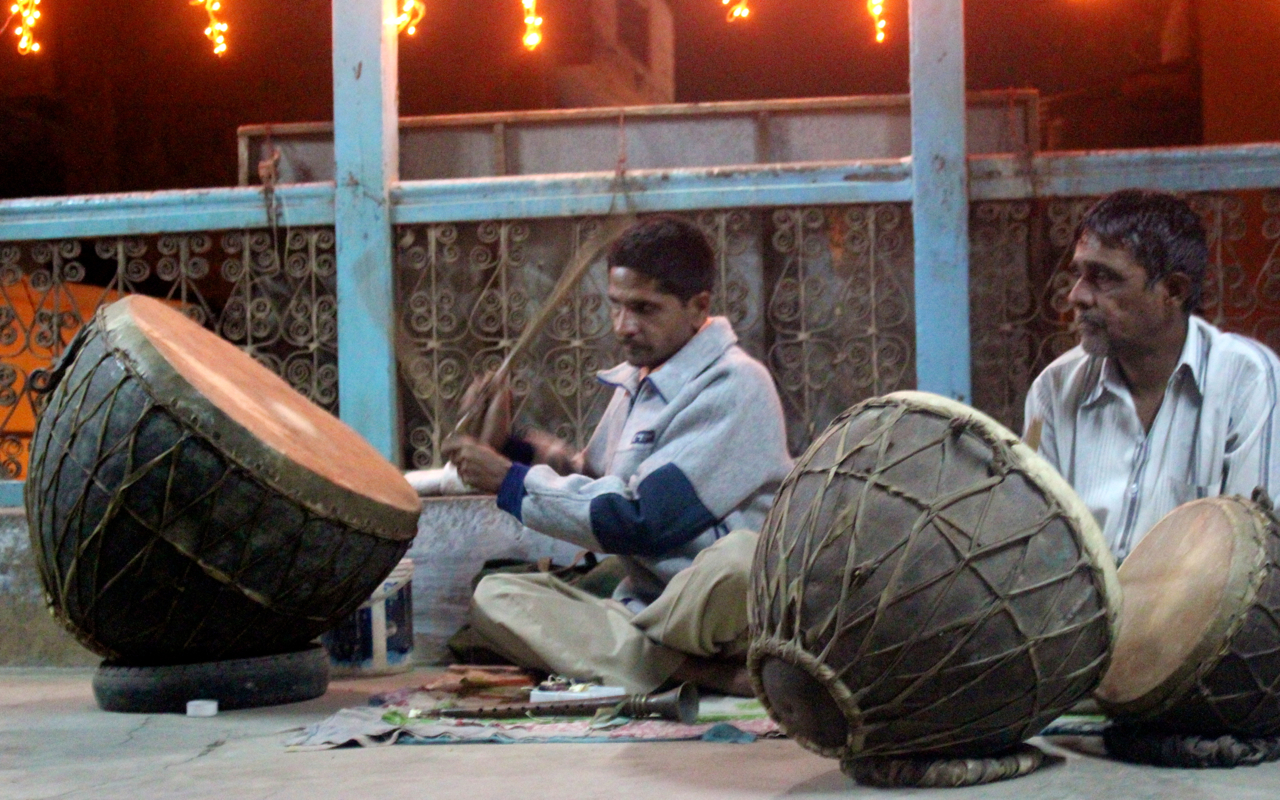
Traditional drummers playing Naubat

The mosque has the tomb of Ahmad Shah I, the founder of Ahmedabad in centre. It was completed by his son Muhammad Shah II (r. 1442–1451) who is buried to his left. His grandson Qutb-ud-Din Ahmad Shah II (1451–1458) is buried to his right. The tomb of Ahmad Shah's brother is outside of the main chamber. On Ahmad Shah's tomb flowers and chadars are still offered.

== Architecture ==
The mosque has the main square building with large central dome. There are four chambers at all four corners with smaller domes. The tombs are in centre. The chamber is lit with delicately carved stone screens, (jaalis).

Women are not allowed to enter, and men must cover their heads before entering. There are also tombs of a few ministers laid across the road.

== Naubat ==
Naubat is a traditional orchestra which announced arrival and departure of the king, welcomed dignitaries, marked beginning of wars and special occasions like birth, death or marriage of Royals. They were also time keepers of the city. Naubat is still played as a remembrance of Ahmad Shah near the tomb. The ninth generation of Naubat musicians plays nagara and shehnai every day at Naubat Khana, a drum room above the entrance of the tomb. They played Naubat at evening to announce the sunset and at night to announce the closing of the gates of fort during royal times. They are played at 19:30 (or sunset) and 23:00 IST every day. On Thursday and Friday three more Naubats are played; 09:00, 12:00 and 15:00 IST.

== Gallery ==
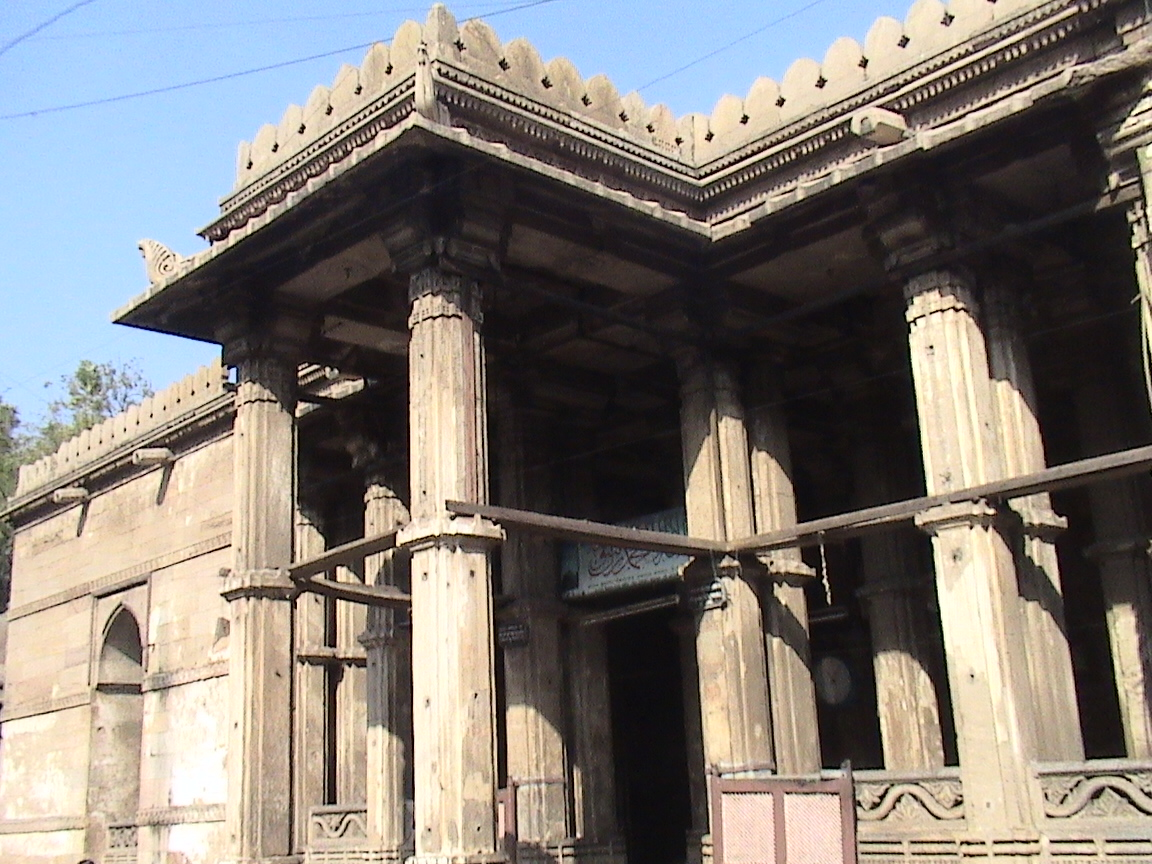
Badshah no Hajiro, Tomb of Ahmed Shah

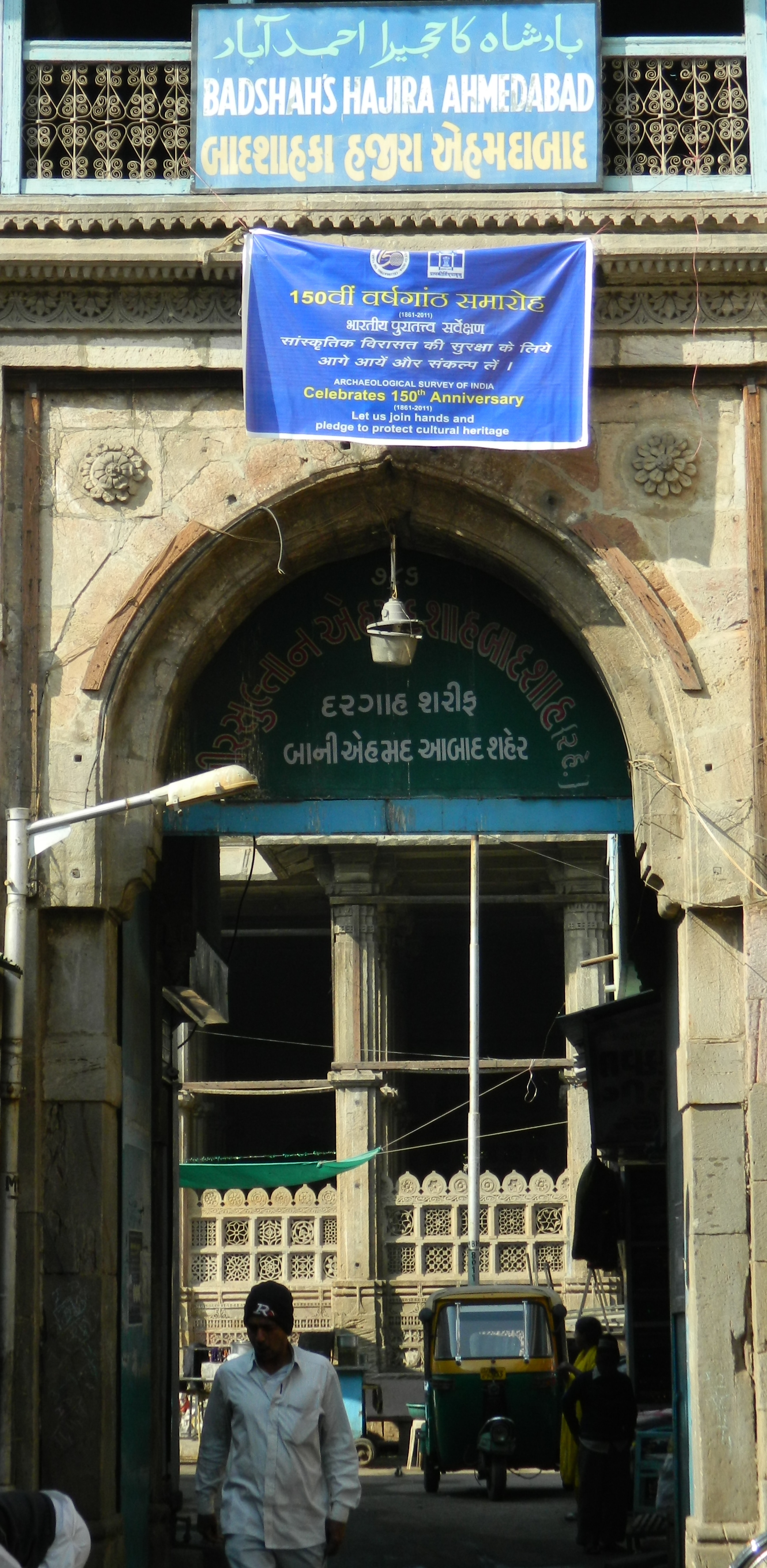
Gate of Tomb

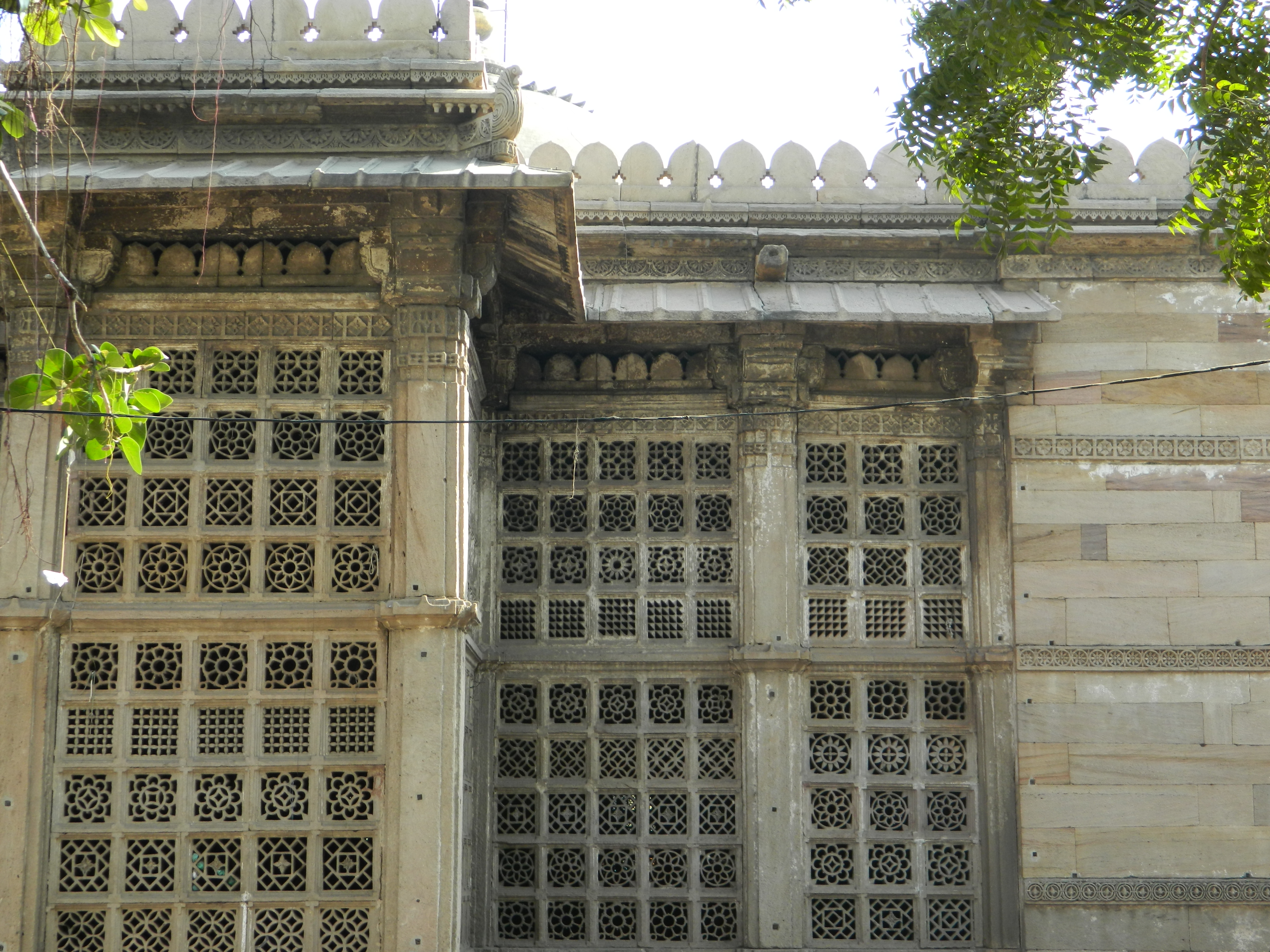
Lattice work in windows of tomb

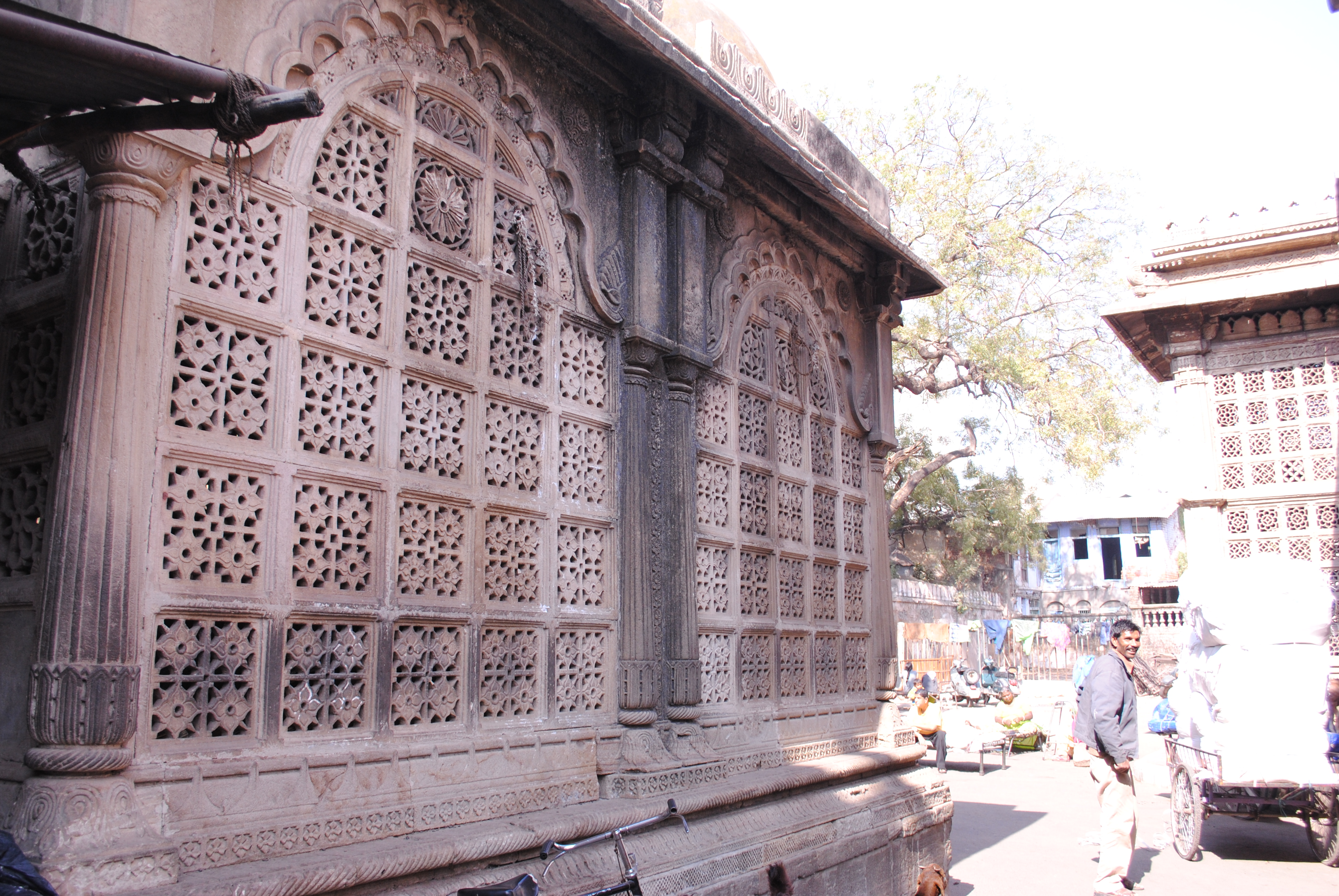
Lattice work

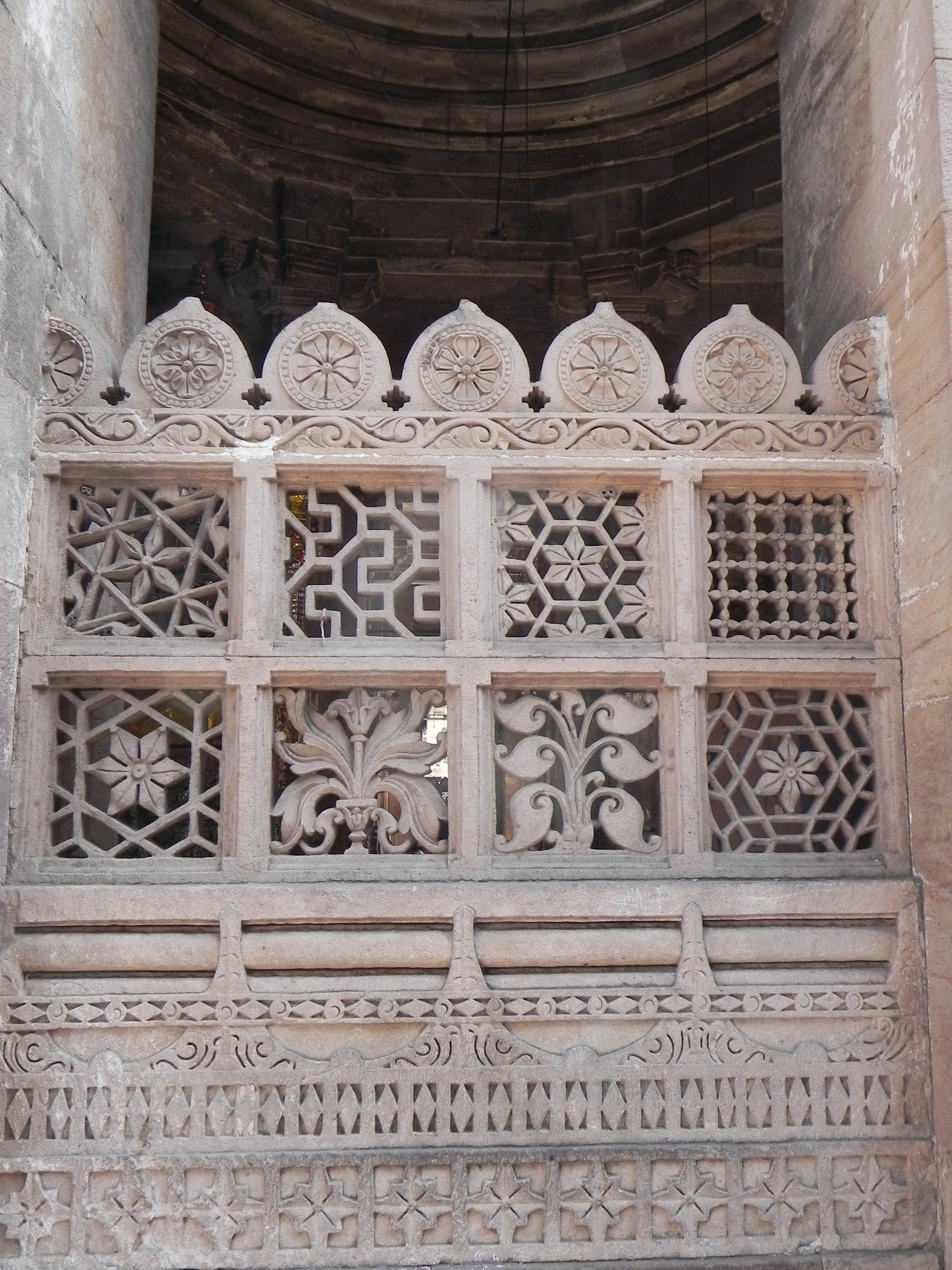
Lattice work

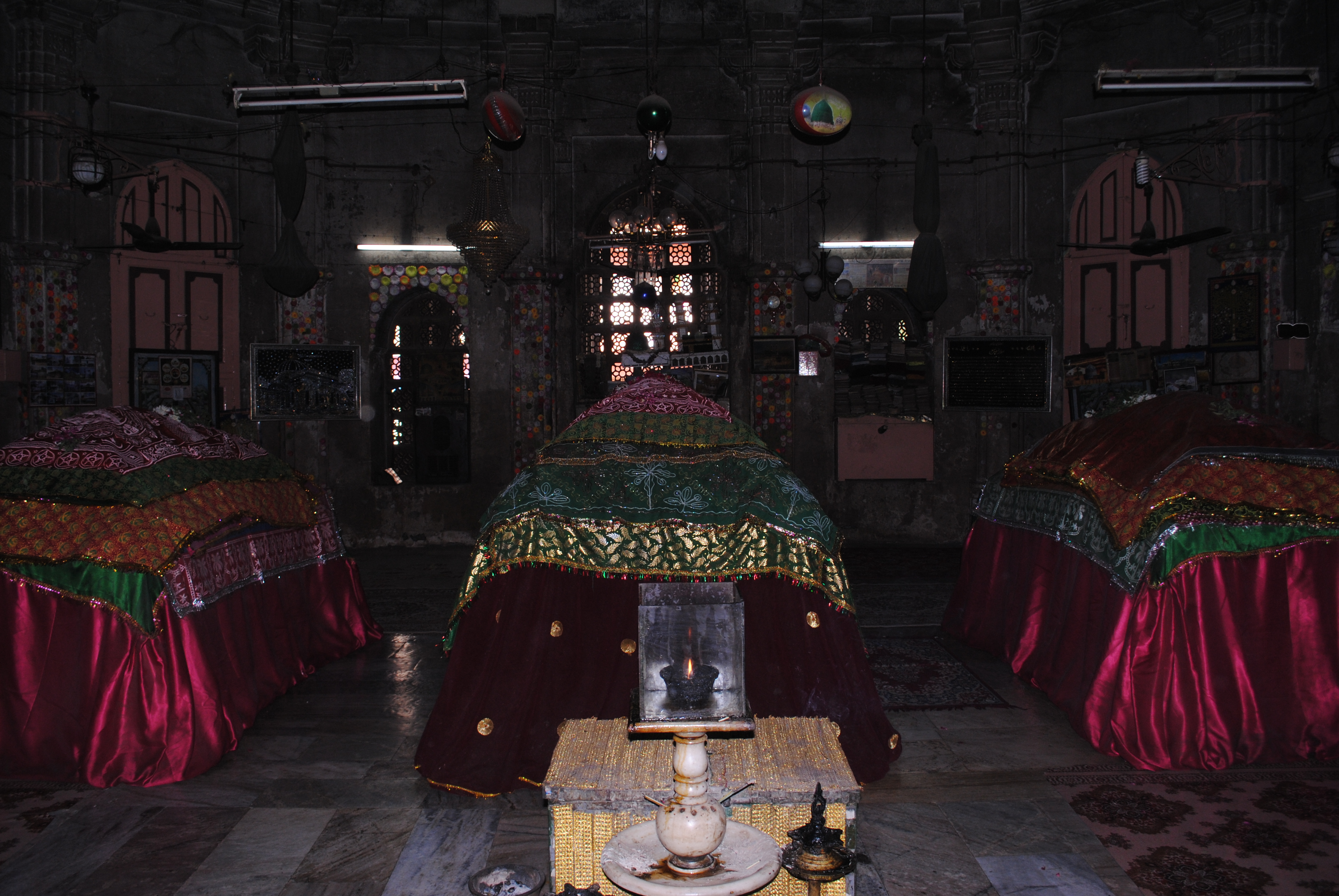
Tomb

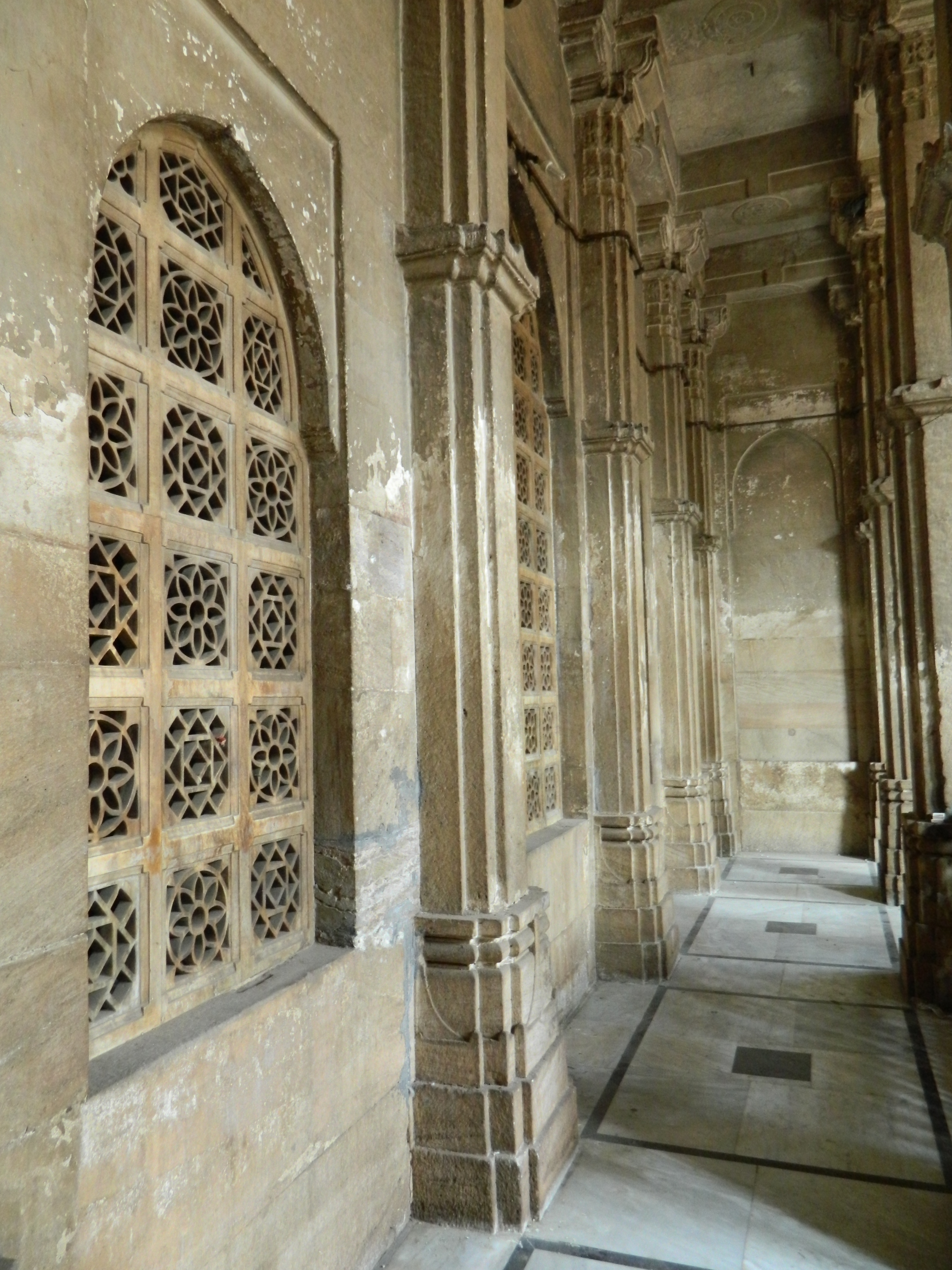
Pillars and windows

== See also ==
- Rani no Hajiro
