= Rani no Hajiro =

Tomb complex near Manek Chowk, Ahmedabad, India

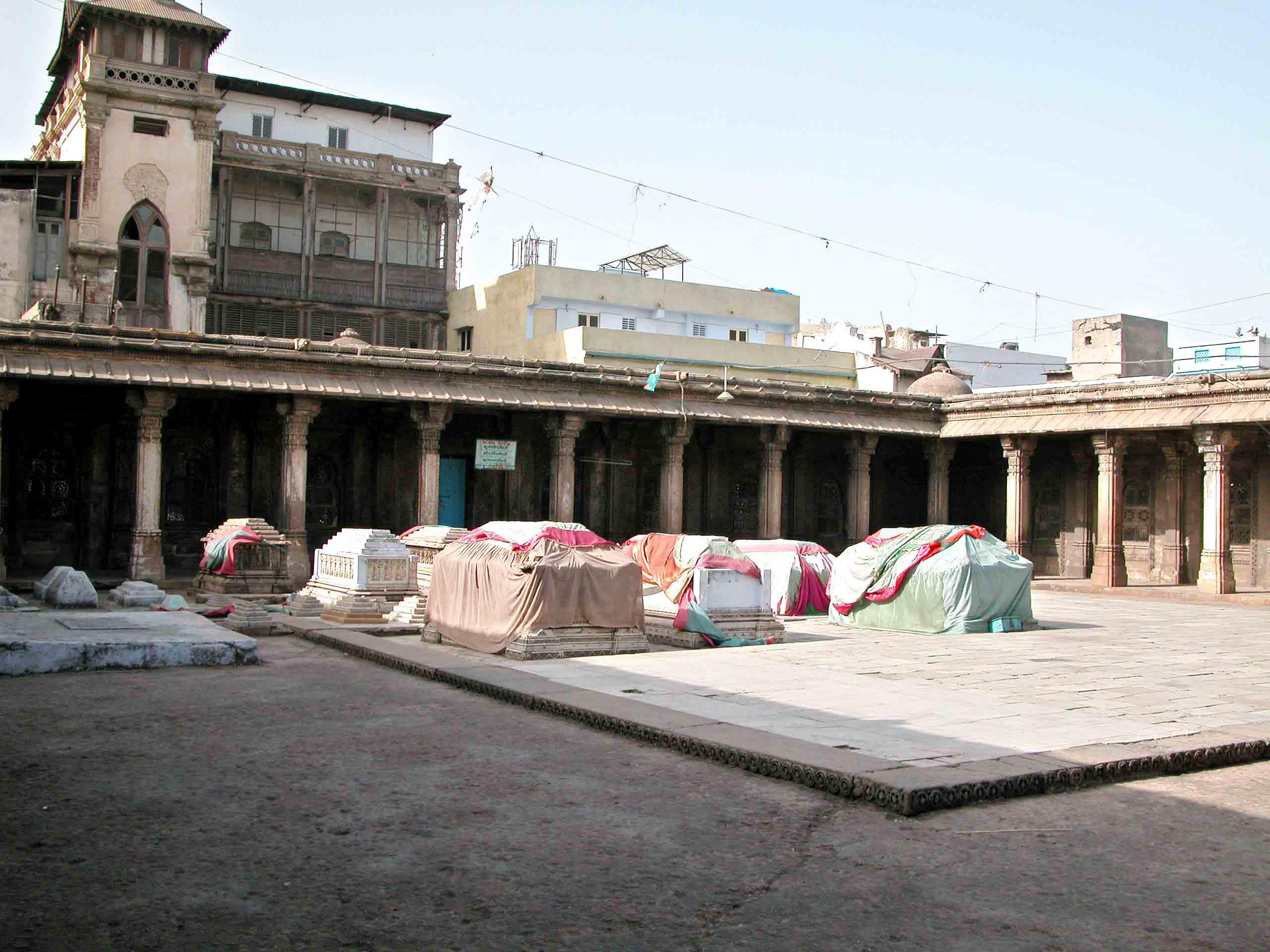
- Tombs of Queens of Ahmed Shah I

- Location in Ahmedabad, Gujarat, India Rani no Hajiro (Gujarat)

Religion
- Affiliation: Islam
- Status: Active

Location
- Location: Manek Chowk, Ahmedabad
- Municipality: Ahmedabad Municipal Corporation
- State: Gujarat
- Coordinates: 23.0237592°N 72.5890972°E

Architecture
- Type: Mosque and tomb
- Style: Indo-Islamic architecture
- Completed: c. 1440

Rani no Hajiro, also known as Mughalai Bibi's Tomb or Tombs of Ahmed Shah's Queens, is a tomb complex near Manek Chowk, Ahmedabad, India.

== History and architecture ==
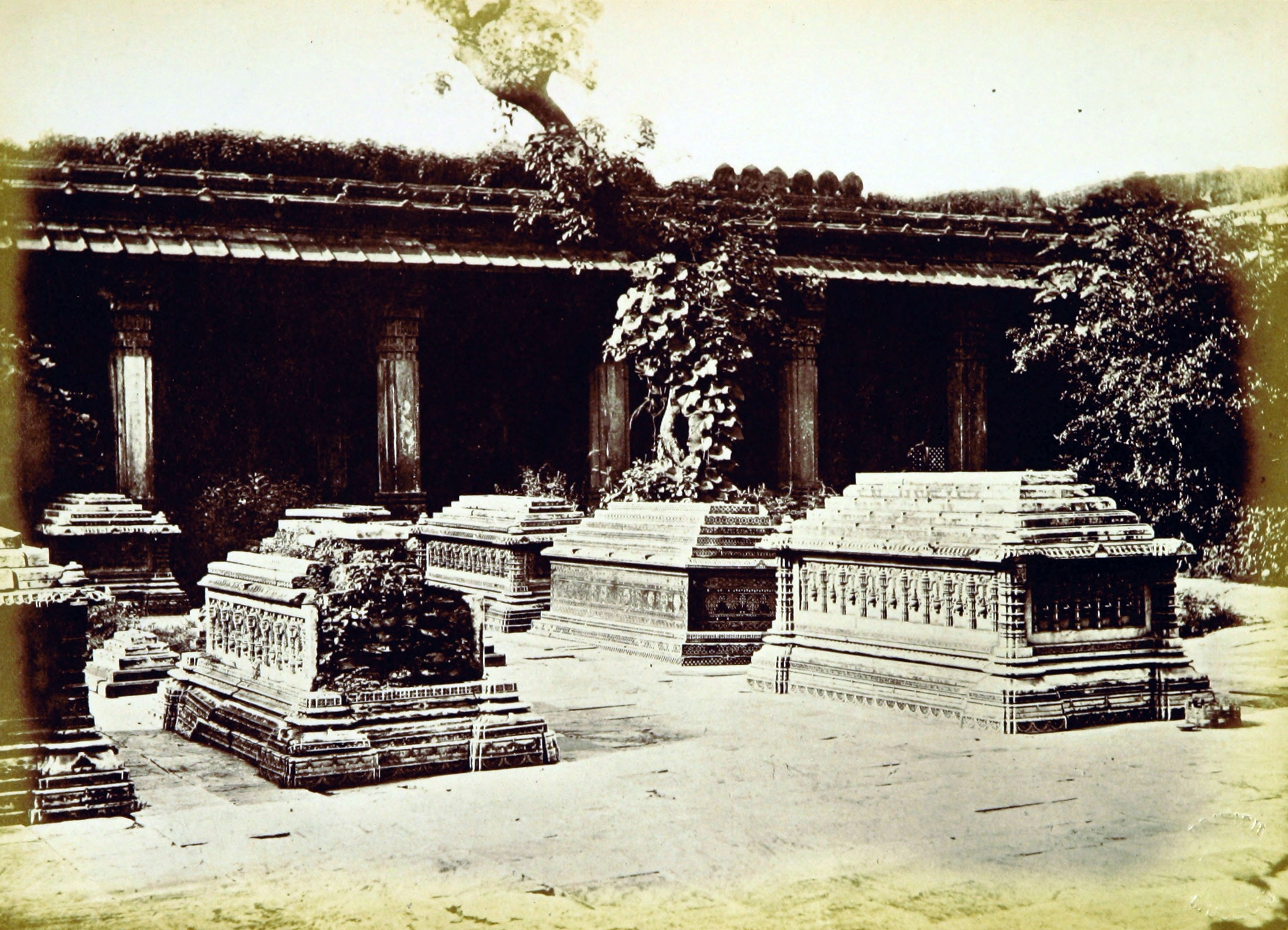
Tombs of Queens of Ahmed Shah I in 1866

Rani no Hajiro is located near Manek Chowk, east of Ahmed Shah's Tomb. The enclosure is elevated above the ground and entered through a lofty gateway and the courtyard surrounded by a trellised cloister. The walls of the cloister are fitted with carved stone screens. The square open enclosure measures 36.58 metres on each side is probably built in 1445. The courtyard contains eight marble tombs of queens of Ahmed Shah I and other Gujarat Sultanate rulers. They are elaborately carved and inlaid with work of mother-of-pearl and metal.

The principal tomb belongs to Mughalai Bibi, the wife of Muhammad Shah II and mother of Mahmud Begada. It is richly carved in white marble, and girt with a Persian inscription in minute relief. An adjacent tomb in black marble, once inlaid with mother-of-pearl, belongs to Mirki or Murki Bibi, the wife of Shah e Alam, the sister of queen and the daughter of Jam of Sindh. These tombs are covered with rich brocade works, the textile style developed during reign of Ahmed Shah I. The intricate stone tracery and carving is an amalgamation of Hindu, Jain, and Islamic architectural styles. Some Muslim families live inside the complex and take care of the tombs.

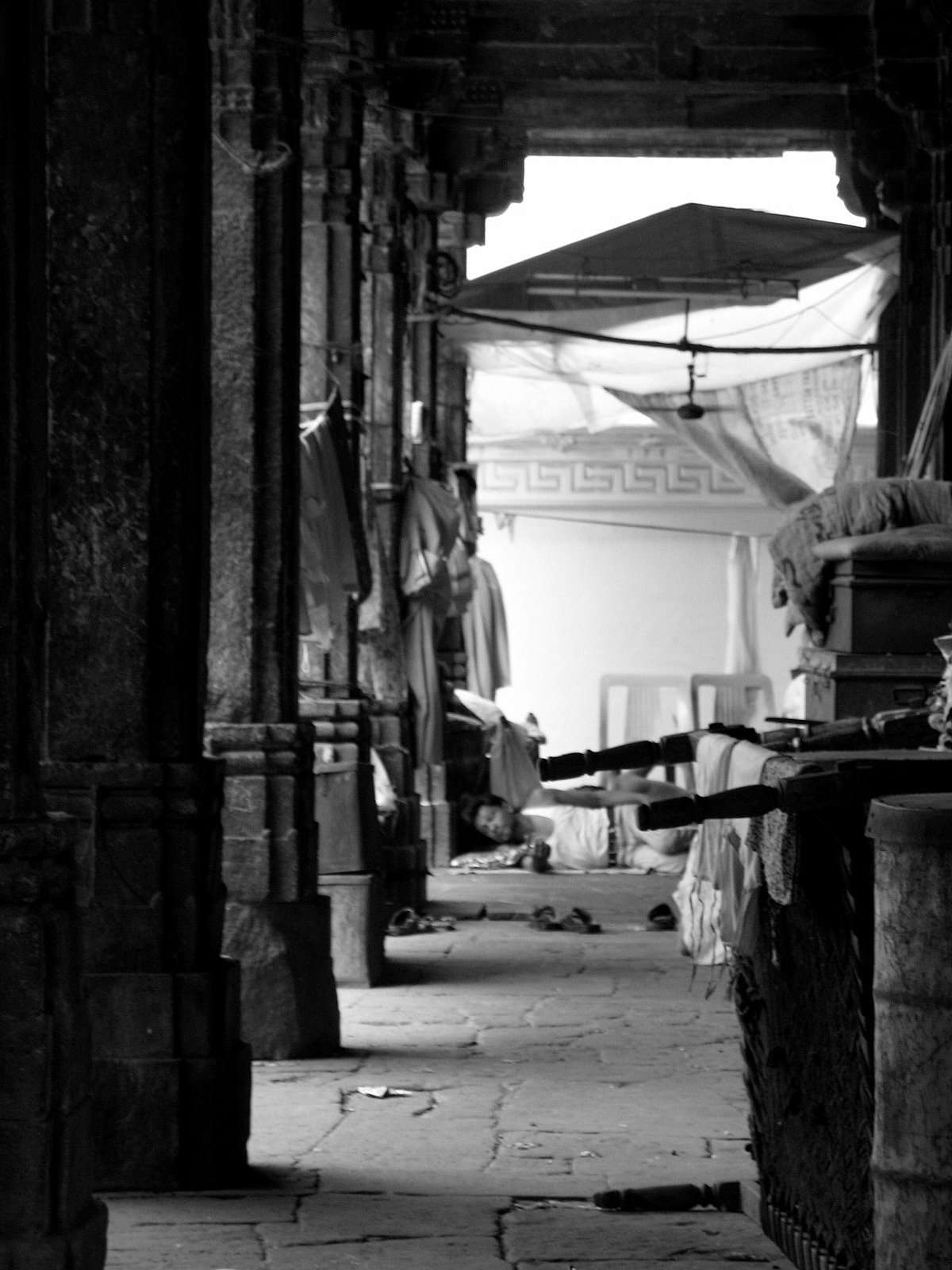
Siesta in Rani no Hajiro

== Market ==
The area surrounding the complex is now a market for women's clothing, jewellery and accessories. Traditional Garba clothing is also sold there. Many types of stalls selling mouth fresheners and mukhwas are located nearby.

== Gallery ==
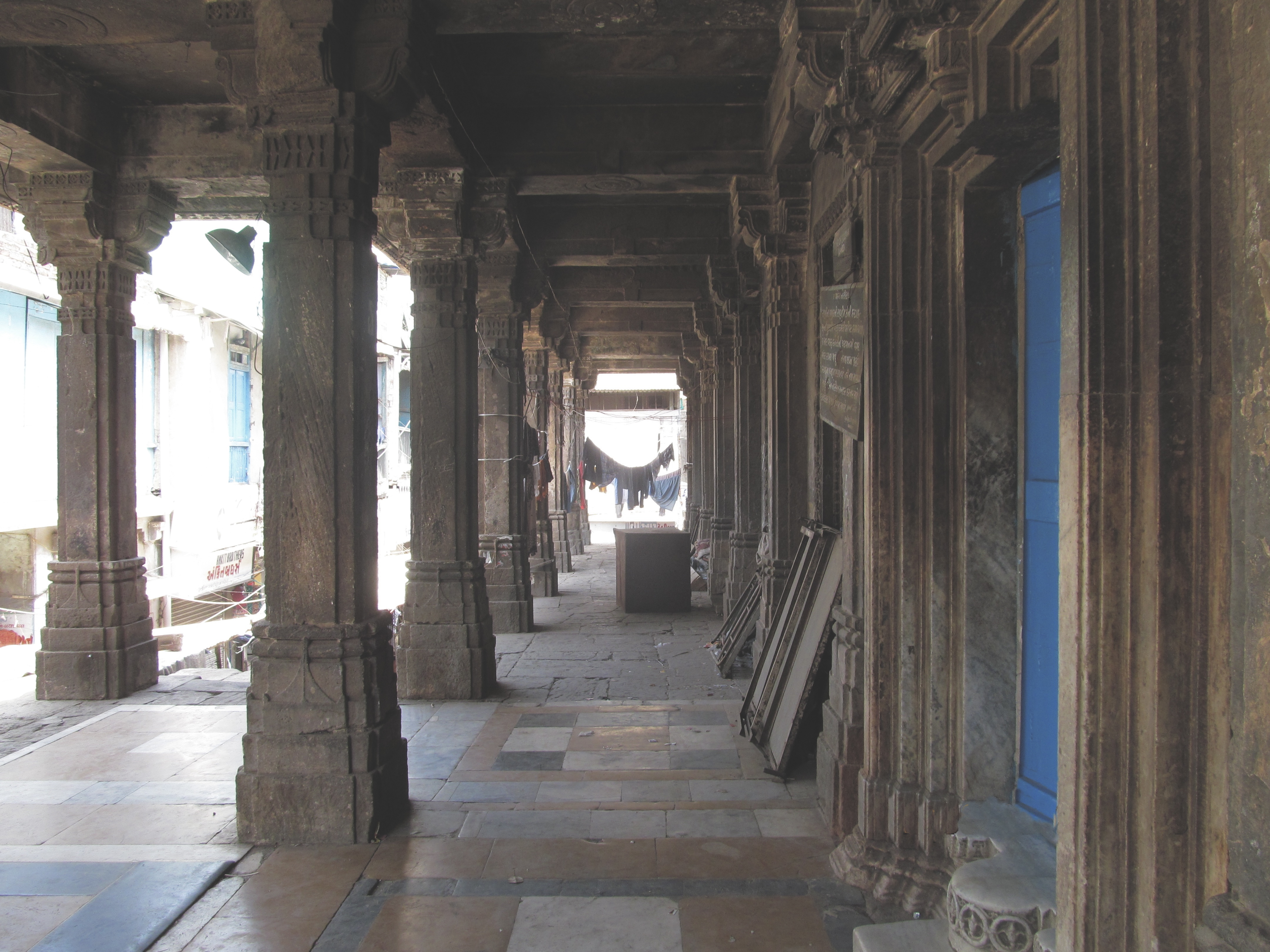
Cloister

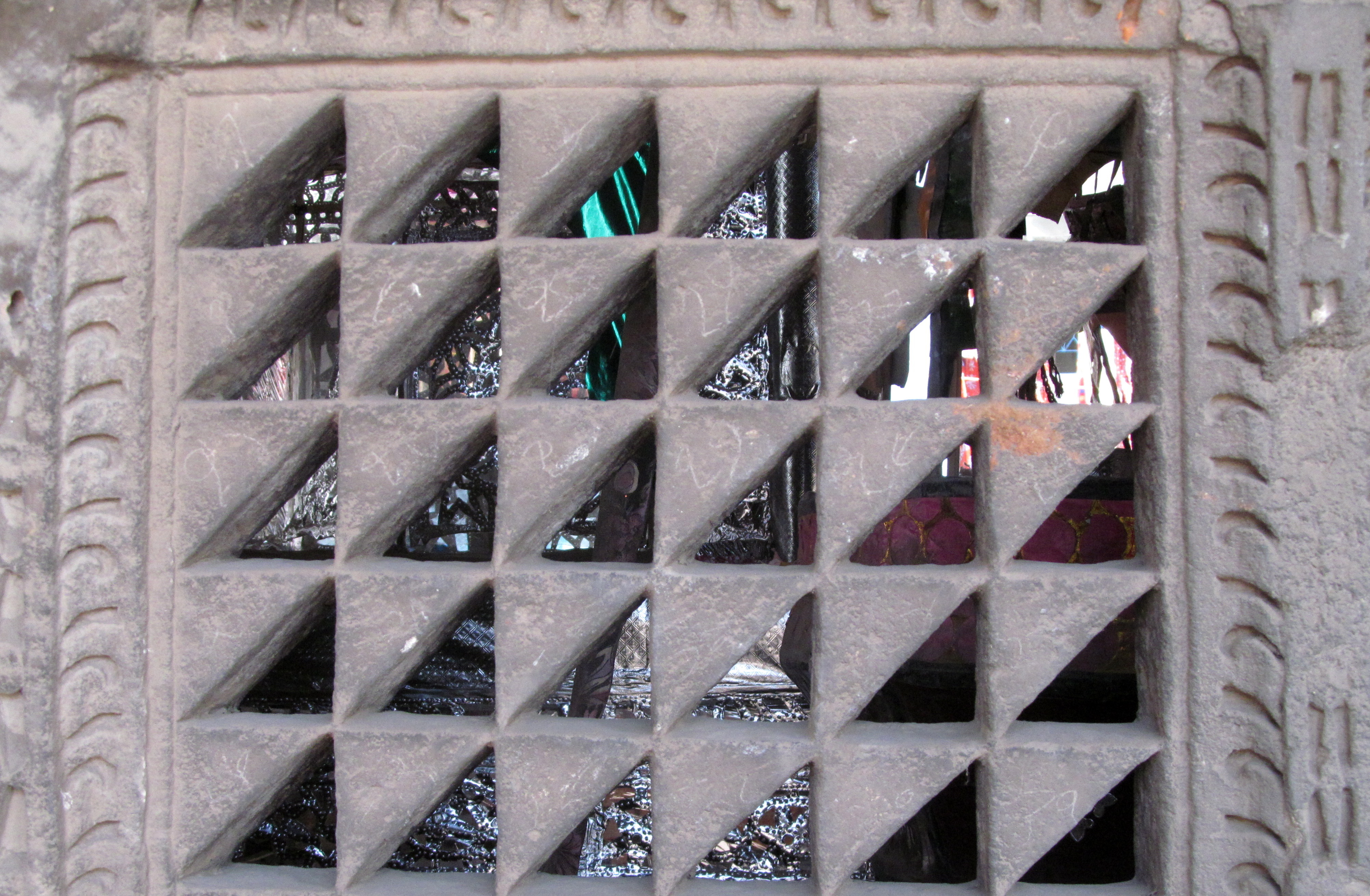
Lattice work in stone window

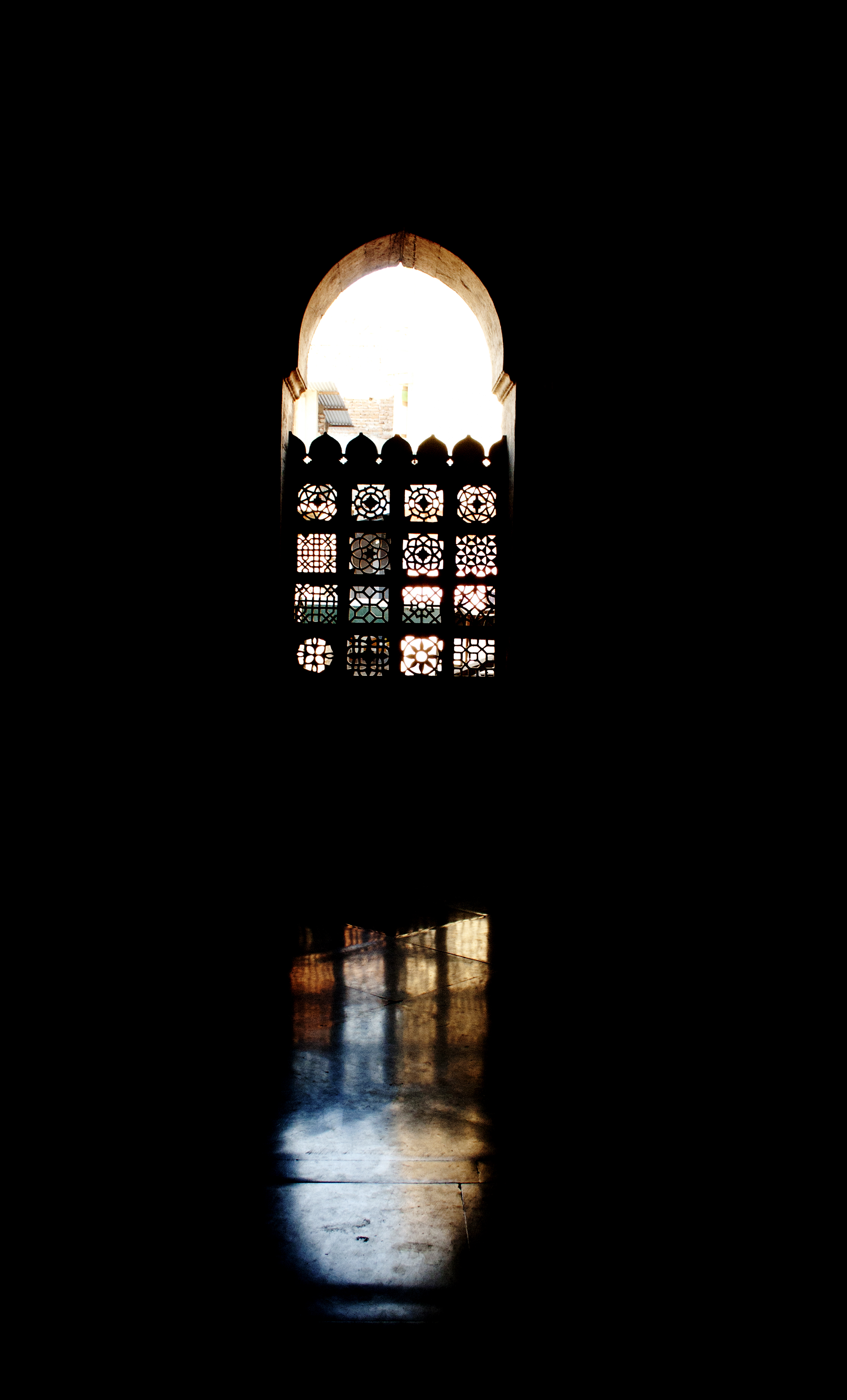
Lattice work

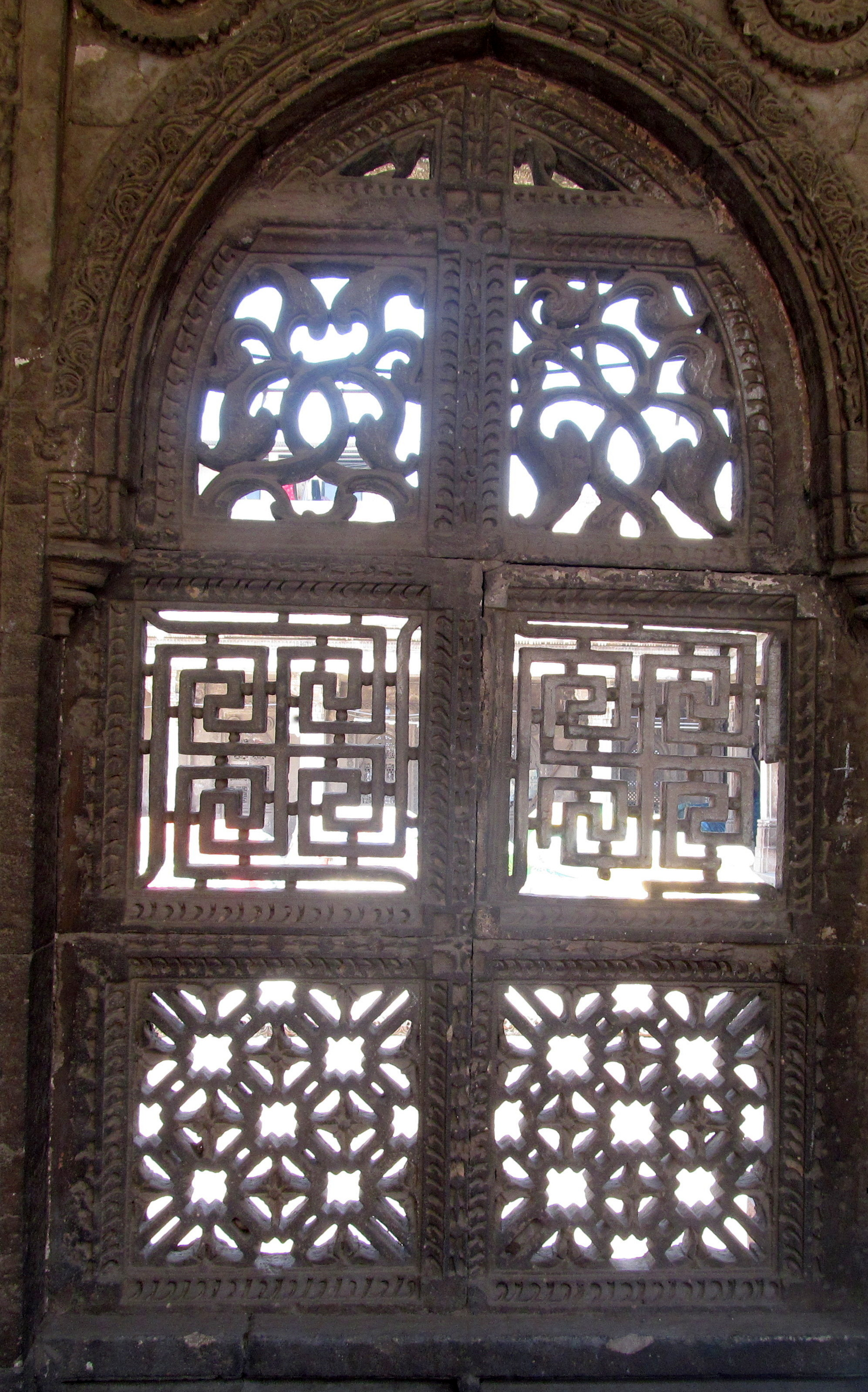
Lattice work in windows

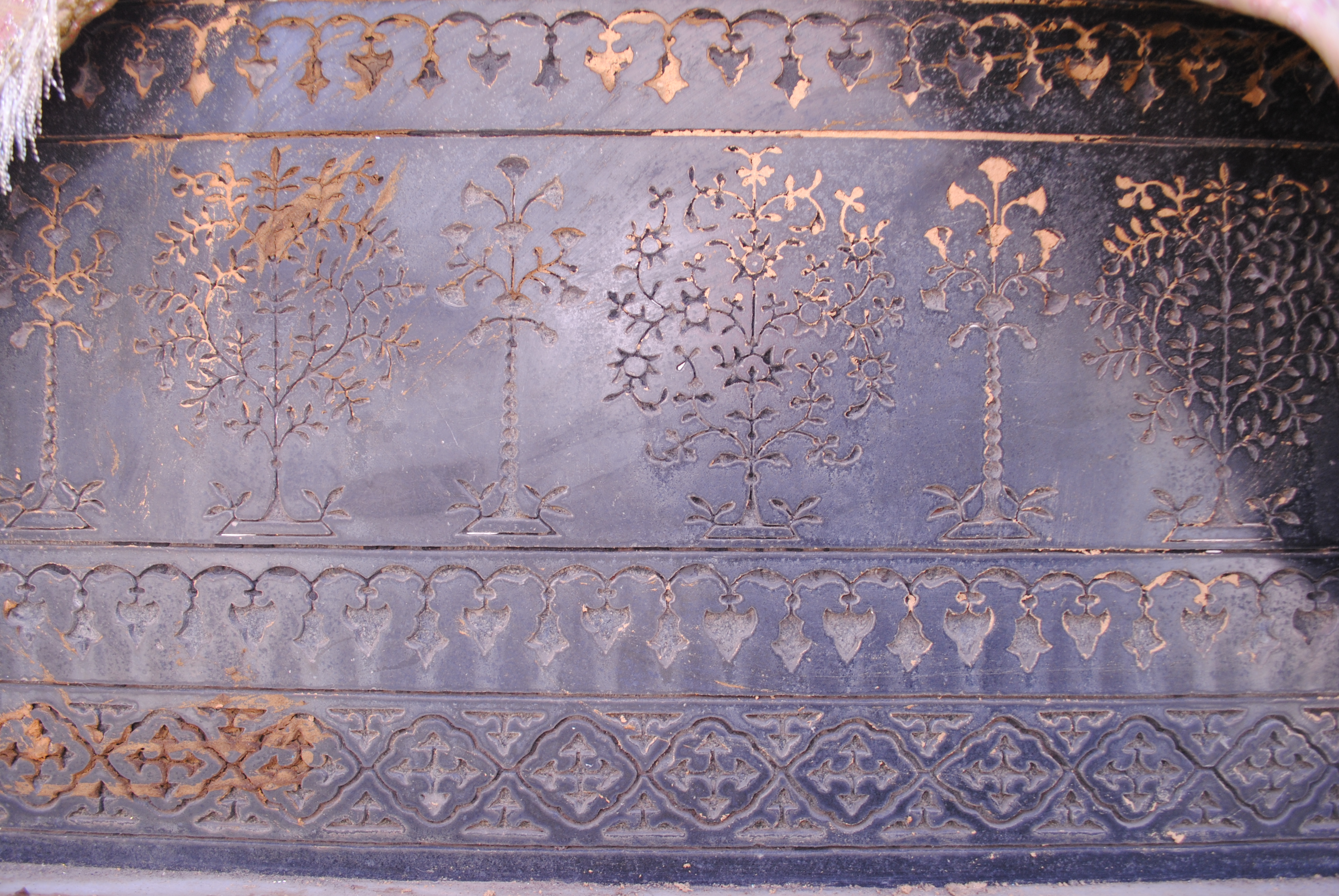
Details of the tomb

== See also ==
- Ahmed Shah's Tomb
