= Azam =

Azam may refer to:

== Given name ==
- Azam of Kalat, Khan of Kalat, Balochistan 1931–1933
- Azam Ali (born 1970), Iranian singer and musician
- Azam Ali (scientist) (active from 1988), Bangladeshi researcher into biomaterials
- Azam Azih (born 1995), Malaysian footballer
- Azam Cheema (1953–2024), Pakistani Lashkar-e-Taiba member, perpetrator of the 2008 Mumbai attacks
- Azam Farahi (born c. 1958), wife of Iranian former president Mahmoud Ahmadinejad
- Azam Farmonov (active from 2006), Uzbekistani rural development activist who was convicted for extortion
- Azam Ghauri (died 2000), Indian terrorist
- Azam Hussain (born 1985), Pakistani cricketer
- Azam Iqbal (born 1973), Bangladeshi cricketer
- Azam Jah (1907–1970), eldest son of the seventh and last Nizam of Hyderabad
- Azam Jah of the Carnatic (1797-1825), Nawab of the Carnatic region of India 1819–1825
- Azam Jan (born 1983), Pakistani cricketer
- Azam Khan (disambiguation), several people
- Azam Khodayari, Iranian athlete who competed at the 2004 Summer Paralympics
- Azam Radzhabov (born 1993), Belarusian footballer
- Azam Shah (1653–1707), Mughal emperor
- Azam Taleghani (1943–2019), Iranian politician and journalist
- Azam Tariq (disambiguation), several people

== Middle given name ==
- Asif Azam Siddiqi (active from 2004), Bangladeshi-American space historian
- Fakhr Azam Wazir (active from 2013), Pakistani politician
- Hendra Azam Idris (born 1988), Bruneian international footballer
- Ghiyasuddin Azam Shah (reigned 1390–1411), third Sultan of Bengal
- Lila Azam Zanganeh (born 1986), French-Iranian writer
- Moavia Azam Tariq (active from 2018), Pakistani politician
- Mohd Badrul Azam Mohd Zamri (born 1984), Malaysian professional footballer
- Muhammed Azam Didamari (died 1765), Sufi Kashmiri writer in the Persian language
- Muhammad Farooq Azam Malik (active from 2018), Pakistani politician
- Parveen Azam Ali (born 1979), British nurse of Pakistani origin
- Sanwar Azam Sunny (born 1989), Bangladeshi artist, environmental activist and social entrepreneur
- Sardar Muhammad Azam Khan Musakhel (died 2018), Pakistani politician
- Shafiqul Azam Khan (born 1966), Bangladesh politician
- Sher Azam Khan (active from 2018), Pakistani politician
- Zahra Sadr-Azam Nouri (active from 1996), Iranian reformist politician

== Surname ==
- Ali Azam (politician, born 1972), Bangladeshi MP
- Babar Azam (born 1994), Pakistani international cricketer
- Hammad Azam (born 1991), Pakistani cricketer
- Ahad Azam (born 1992), Israeli-Druze footballer
- Ahmad Ammar Ahmad Azam (1993–2013), moderate Islamic activist in Malaysia and Turkey
- Étienne Eugène Azam (1822–1899), French surgeon and psychologist
- Fakhrul Azam, Chief of the Air Staff of Bangladesh Air Force 2002-2007
- Farooq Azam (active from 1983), Pakistani marine microbiologist
- Haseeb Azam (born 1986), Pakistani cricketer
- Ghulam Azam (1922–2014), Bangladeshi politician
- Jan Azam (1924–?), Pakistani sports shooter who competed at the 1952 Summer Olympics
- Khurshid Azam (born 1942), Pakistani field hockey player who competed at the 1964 Summer Olympics
- Mian Muhammad Azam (born 1952), Pakistani politician
- Mir Azam (born 1978), Pakistani cricketer
- Mirza Azam (born 1962), Bangladeshi politician
- Mohammad Azam (born 1980), Emirati cricketer
- Mohammed Abdullah Azam (born 1970), British citizen convicted of terrorism offences
- Nasser Azam (born 1963), Pakistani-British artist
- Olivier Azam (born 1974), French rugby union footballer
- Rafiq Azam (born 1963), Bangladeshi architect
- Rahil Azam (born 1981), Indian model and television actor
- Rizwan Azam (born 1985), Pakistani male badminton player
- Saiful Azam (1941–2020), Pakistani/Bangladeshi air force officer
- Sarwar Azam (born 1952), Bangladeshi soldier, head of the Singranatore family
- Shehzad Azam (born 1985), Pakistani cricketer
- Zafar Azam (active from 2018), Pakistani politician

== Other ==
- Azam F.C., an association football club in Dar es Salaam, Tanzania
- Azam TV, an East African direct broadcast satellite service

== See also ==
- Abu Azam, a village in Shoaybiyeh-ye Gharbi Rural District, Shadravan District, Shushtar County, Khuzestan Province, Iran
- Azam and Muazzam Khan's Tomb, Vasna, Ahmedabad, India
- Azam Basti, a neighbourhood of Jamshed Town in Karachi, Sindh, Pakistan
- Azam Jahi Mills, Warangal, a defunct Indian textile company in Hyderabad
- Azam mosque of Qom, Iran
- Azam Nagar, a village in Gujrat District, Punjab, Pakistan
- Azzam (disambiguation)
- Chowk Azam, a city in Layyah District, Punjab, Pakistan
- Ismul Azam, a name of Allah
- Jama Azam, a village in Jahanabad Rural District, in the Central District of Hirmand County, Sistan and Baluchestan Province, Iran
- Khushinan Azam, a village in Miyan Darband Rural District, in the Central District of Kermanshah County, Kermanshah Province, Iran
- Omm ol Azam, a village in Veys Rural District, Veys District, Bavi County, Khuzestan Province, Iran
- Mughal-e-Azam (disambiguation)
