= Khvoshinan =

Khvoshinan or Khowshinan or Khushinan or Khvoshi Nan (Persian: خوشينان), also rendered as Khoshnian, may refer to:

- Khvoshinan-e Olya, Kermanshah Province
- Khvoshinan-e Sofla, Kermanshah Province
- Khvoshinan-e Vosta, Kermanshah Province
- Khushinan, a village in Kurdistan Province, Iran
