= 2025 SAFF U-17 Championship squads =

Squads for football competition

The following squads were announced for the 2025 SAFF U-17 Championship, organized by the South Asian Football Federation (SAFF).

Each team is permitted to register a maximum of 23 players for the tournament.

== Group A ==
=== Sri Lanka ===
The Sri Lanka U17 Men's National Team announced their final 23-member squad for the tournament on 14 September 2025.

Head coach: (Sri Lanka) Fazul Rahuman

Note: Flags indicate national team as defined under FIFA eligibility rules; some limited exceptions apply. Players may hold more than one non-FIFA nationality.

No.	Pos.	Nation	Player
1		SRI	Mohamed Rishad
2		SRI	Humaid Haroon
3		SRI	T. Thanushiyan
4		SRI	Marco Jayathunga
5		SRI	M.U.M. Usman
6		SRI	Y.I.M. Irfan
7		SRI	M.F. Halik
8		SRI	Adnan Ameen
9		SRI	Ishaq Mouffer (Captain)
10		SRI	A. Aamish Wasim
11		SRI	R.A. Yahya
12		SRI	Zakariyya Zafarullah

No.	Pos.	Nation	Player
13		SRI	Aditha Wickramarathne
14		SRI	M.H. Ashfak Ahamed
15		SRI	Pavan Fernando
16		SRI	Hiruka Ratnayake
17		SRI	Mohamed Zaidh
18		SRI	M. E. Tinusha Perera
19		SRI	Nusraan Nazeer
20		SRI	M.R.M. Rakan
21		SRI	Shaathin Shaheed
22		SRI	Hamood Rizwan
23		SRI	S.K. Kevinash

=== Bangladesh ===
The Bangladesh U17 Men's National Team named their final squad on 13 September 2025.

Head coach: (Bangladesh) Golam Rabbani Choton

Note: Flags indicate national team as defined under FIFA eligibility rules; some limited exceptions apply. Players may hold more than one non-FIFA nationality.

No.	Pos.	Nation	Player
1	GK	BAN	Alif Rahman Imtiage
2	DF	BAN	Sabbir Islam
3	DF	BAN	Ihsan Habib Riduan
4	DF	BAN	Azam Khan
5	DF	BAN	Ikramul Islam
6	DF	BAN	Tarek Hossen
7	MF	BAN	Nazmul Huda Faysal (Captain)
8	MF	BAN	Kamal Merdha
9	FW	BAN	Opu Rahman
10	FW	BAN	Md Manik
11	FW	BAN	Ruhul Amin Akash
12	GK	BAN	Tasin Saheb

No.	Pos.	Nation	Player
13	DF	BAN	Shadat Hossain
14	DF	BAN	Md Raj
15	MF	BAN	Md Arif
16	MF	BAN	Akash Ahmed
17	MF	BAN	Bayzit Bostami
18	MF	BAN	Akash Ahammed
19	FW	BAN	Mohin Ahmmed
20	FW	BAN	Ashik
21	FW	BAN	Rifat Kazi
22	FW	BAN	Mahin Miah Sojib
23	GK	BAN	Chandro Saha

=== Nepal ===
The final squad of the national U-17 team for the SAFF U-17 Championship in Sri Lanka.

Head coach: (Nepal) Sanjeet Singh

Note: Flags indicate national team as defined under FIFA eligibility rules; some limited exceptions apply. Players may hold more than one non-FIFA nationality.

No.	Pos.	Nation	Player
1	GK	NEP	Pemba Norbu Bhote
2	DF	NEP	Prashant Moktan
3	DF	NEP	Dipen Karki
4	DF	NEP	Dhiraj Rawal
5	DF	NEP	Aditya Rana Magar
6	DF	NEP	Bhuban Kami
7	MF	NEP	Prashant Menyangbo
8	MF	NEP	Ram Thami
9	FW	NEP	Samir Kumar
10	FW	NEP	Dig Bijay Shahi
11	FW	NEP	Nis Kumar Shrestha
12	GK	NEP	Ram Bohara

No.	Pos.	Nation	Player
13	DF	NEP	Anmol Karki
14	DF	NEP	Mausam Rokaya
15	DF	NEP	Anoj Khadka
16	MF	NEP	Krishta Bhandari
17	MF	NEP	Pratish Thapa Magar
18	MF	NEP	Bhupesh Lama
19	MF	NEP	Nasib Henjan
20	MF	NEP	Sushan Magar
21	MF	NEP	Sujan Syangtan
22	FW	NEP	Rohit Shrestha
23	GK	NEP	Bishesh Baniya

== Group B ==
=== India ===
The India U17 Men's National Team named their final squad on 12 September 2025.

Head coach: (India) Bibiano Fernandes

Note: Flags indicate national team as defined under FIFA eligibility rules; some limited exceptions apply. Players may hold more than one non-FIFA nationality.

No.	Pos.	Nation	Player
1	GK	IND	Manashjyoti Baruah
2	DF	IND	Houlungou Mate
3	DF	IND	Indra Rana Magar
4	DF	IND	Konthoujam Korou Meitei
5	DF	IND	Md Aimaan Bin
6	DF	IND	Lawmsangzuala
7	MF	IND	Abrar Ali Baba
8	MF	IND	Dallalmuon Gangte
9	FW	IND	Aazim Parveez Najar
10	FW	IND	Azlaan Shah Kh
11	FW	IND	Gunleiba Wangkheirakpam
12	GK	IND	Maroof Shafi

No.	Pos.	Nation	Player
13	DF	IND	Shubham Poonia
14	DF	IND	Yumnam Maldino Singh
15	MF	IND	Thanggoumang Touthang
16	MF	IND	Thokchom Diamond Singh
17	MF	IND	Wangkhem Denny Singh
18	MF	IND	Yengkhom Nitishkumar Meitei
19	FW	IND	Hrishikesh Charan Manavathi
20	FW	IND	Kamgouhao Doungel
21	FW	IND	Lesvin Rebelo
22	FW	IND	Rahan Ahmed
23	GK	IND	Rajrup Sarkar

=== Pakistan ===
The Pakistan Football Federation (PFF) has announced the squad for the upcoming SAFF U-17 Championship 2025, scheduled to be held in Sri Lanka from September 15 to 27.

Head coach: (Pakistan) Syed Nasir Ismail

Note: Flags indicate national team as defined under FIFA eligibility rules; some limited exceptions apply. Players may hold more than one non-FIFA nationality.

No.	Pos.	Nation	Player
1	GK	PAK	Samar Razzaq
2	DF	PAK	Nadeem Hussain
3	DF	PAK	Muhammad Alam
4	DF	PAK	Muhammad Masood
5	DF	PAK	Muhammad Zubair
6	DF	PAK	Shahid Anjum
7	MF	PAK	Mustafa Israr
8	MF	PAK	Abdul Samad
9	FW	PAK	Muhammad Abdullah
10	FW	PAK	Mansoor Ahmed
11	FW	PAK	Hasnain Wali Raza
12	GK	PAK	Khalil Jibran

No.	Pos.	Nation	Player
13	DF	PAK	Aabiss Raza
14	DF	PAK	Azizullah
15	MF	PAK	Ibrahim Asif
16	MF	PAK	Muhammad Talha
17	MF	PAK	Haroon Rasheed
18	MF	PAK	Muhammad Essa
19	MF	PAK	Saad Tiwana
20	FW	PAK	Muhammad Owais
21	FW	PAK	Hamza Yasir
22	FW	PAK	Syed Shahram
23	GK	PAK	Adil Ali Khan

=== Bhutan ===
The Bhutan Football Federation (BFF) announced their final squad for the SAFF U-17 Championship on 23 September 2025.

Head coach: (Bhutan) Yeshi Wangchuk

Note: Flags indicate national team as defined under FIFA eligibility rules; some limited exceptions apply. Players may hold more than one non-FIFA nationality.

No.	Pos.	Nation	Player
1		BHU	Tashi Yonten
2		BHU	Kingyel Wangchuk Dorji
3		BHU	Chhogyel S Sherab
4		BHU	Ngawang Yonten
5		BHU	Sonam Dorji
6		BHU	K. Dupthop Wangchuk
7		BHU	Thinley Yezer
8		BHU	K. Rigzin Gyeltshen
9		BHU	Pema Yozer
10		BHU	Chimi Tobden Dorji
11		BHU	Kinley Tenzin
12		BHU	Rigsel Tshewang Sonam
13		BHU	Sayon Lama

No.	Pos.	Nation	Player
14		BHU	Kinley Dorji
15		BHU	Rinchen Jangchuk
16		BHU	Dhendup Gyeltshen
17		BHU	Tandin Phuntsho
18		BHU	Tshendu Jamtsho
19		BHU	Yonten Tharchen
20		BHU	Kencho Wangdi
21		BHU	Tandin Penjor
22		BHU	Karma Yeshe Thabkhe

=== Maldives ===
The final squad of the national U-17 team for the SAFF U-17 Championship in Sri Lanka.

Head coach: (Maldives) Sabah Mohamed Ibrahim

Note: Flags indicate national team as defined under FIFA eligibility rules; some limited exceptions apply. Players may hold more than one non-FIFA nationality.

No.	Pos.	Nation	Player
1	GK	MDV	Shaiman Rashaad Rashaad
2	DF	MDV	Ahmed Aahil Athif
3	DF	MDV	Ahmed Amaan Amyn Amin
4	MF	MDV	Thaaiu Abdul Hakeem Hakeem
5	MF	MDV	Daniyal Mohamed Didi Daniyal
6	MF	MDV	Ibrahim Avsam Abdulla Avsam
7	MF	MDV	Aakif bin Mohamed Aakif
8	FW	MDV	Shaadhin Abdul Razzaq
9	MF	MDV	Aidh Mohamed Jaweez
10	MF	MDV	Abdulla Aaish Ali Aaish
11	FW	MDV	Moosa Mikial Shakeeb
12	MF	MDV	Ali Ilaan Ahmed Ilaan (Captain)

No.	Pos.	Nation	Player
13	MF	MDV	Looth bin Saud Looth
14	MF	MDV	Hussain Ilhaam Ibrahim Ibrahim
15	DF	MDV	Abdul Khalig Aanish Abdulla Aslam
16	MF	MDV	Hussain Akmal Rasheed Rasheed
17	MF	MDV	Ali Aflah Aneel Aneel
18	GK	MDV	Mohamed Maail Moosa Moosa
19	FW	MDV	Ehaan Bin ibrahim
20	DF	MDV	Aik Adam
21	MF	MDV	Aiman Ali Ali
22	GK	MDV	Raaim Shiyam Ibrahim
23	MF	MDV	Mohamed Vifaq Jadulla
