= Grand Turk (ship) =

Grand Turk is the name of several ships.

- Grand Turk (1780 ship), a 300-ton U.S. privateer during the American Revolutionary War, built in 1780 for Elias Hasket Derby and owned by the Derby mercantile house, and was the first U.S. ship on the Old China Trade.
- Grand Turk (1791 ship), of 564 tons (bm), built at Salem, Massachusetts. She is no longer listed after 1800.
- Grand Turk (1812 ship), had been launched in 1812 at Wiscasset, Maine for a group of 30 investors from Salem, Massachusetts. She was of 30984/95 tons burthen and 102-ft in length. She made five voyages as a privateer under a letter of marque for the War of 1812. During these cruises she captured over 30 vessels. She also held a letter of marque from 1815 for the Second Barbary War that was never used. In May 1814, the Post Office Packet Service Hinchinbrooke packet from Falmouth, Cornwall repelled an attack by Grand Turk in a single ship action.
- Grand Turk (frigate), a replica Napoleonic era three-masted French frigate built in 1996.
- HMS Grand Turk, was a frigate of 22 guns that entered the French Navy in 1845 and that the British Royal Navy captured on 4 June 1745. She was sold in 1749.

== See also ==
- Grand Turk (disambiguation)
