= Muazzam Khan =

Muazzam Khan may refer to:

- Azam and Muazzam Khan, Persian brothers who were archers and architects in the early 1400s. Their Roza or tomb is a medieval brick tomb in Vasna, Ahmedabad, India.
- Mir Jumla II (1591–1663), known as Mu'azzam Khan, subahdar of Bengal under the Mughal Emperor Aurangze
- Khizr Muazzam Khan (born 1950), lawyer and political speaker
  - Humayun Saqib Muazzam Khan (1976–2004), the son of Khizr Khan killed in action during the Iraq War
- Muazzam Mujahid Ali Khan, musician in the Rizwan-Muazzam group
