= Sarkhej Roza =

Mosque and tomb complex in Gujarat, India

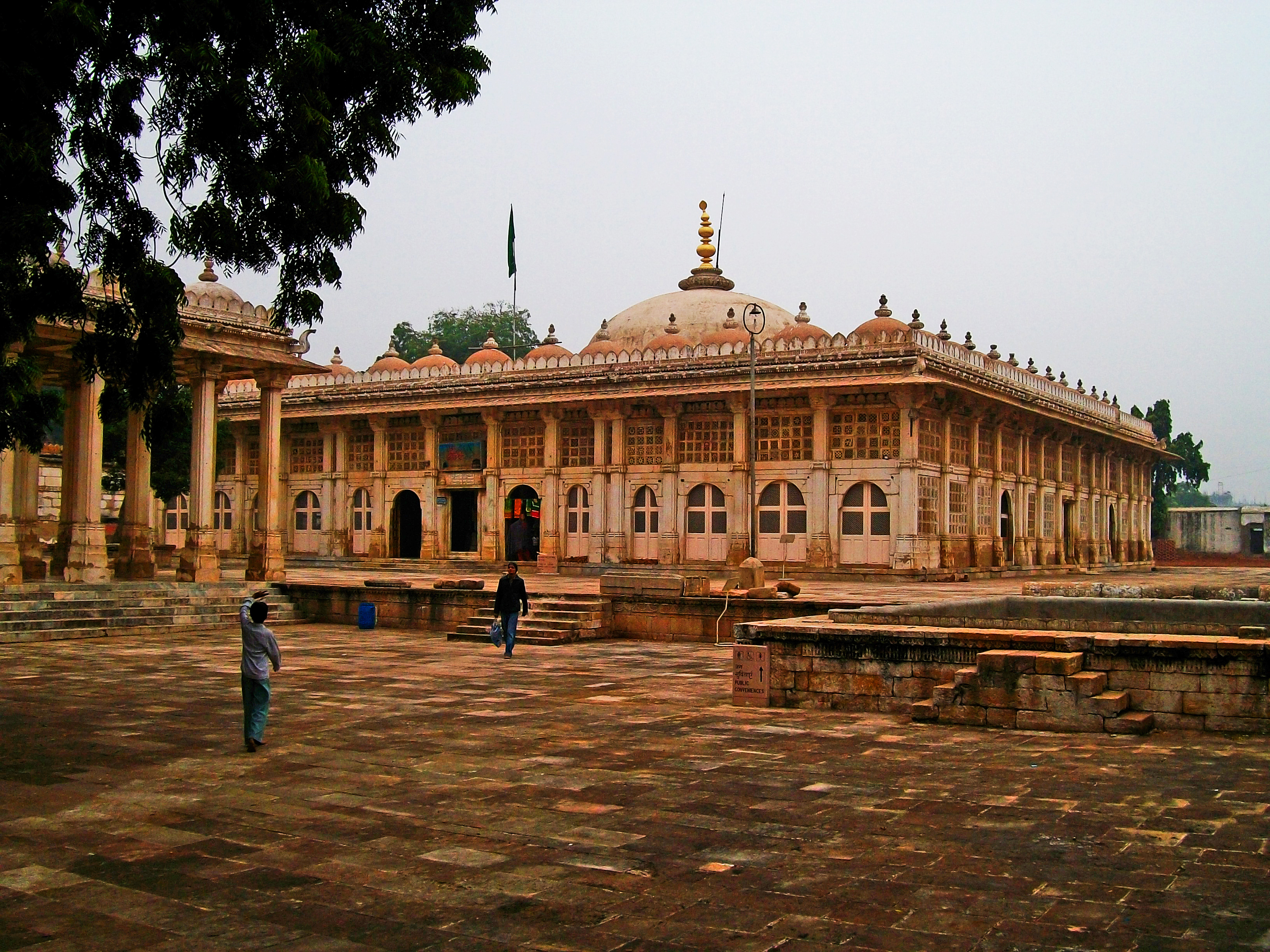
- Ganj Baksh's tomb within the complex

- Location in Ahmedabad

Religion
- Affiliation: Sunni Islam
- Rite: Sufism
- Ecclesiastical or organisational status: Tomb and mosque
- Status: Active

Location
- Location: Makarba, Ahmedabad, Ahmedabad district, Gujarat
- Coordinates: 22°59′32″N 72°30′16″E

Architecture
- Architect: Azam and Muazzam Khan
- Type: Mosque architecture
- Style: Indo-Saracenic
- Funded by: Sultan of Gujarat
- Groundbreaking: 1445
- Completed: 1451

Specifications
- Dome: Eleven (maybe more)
- Site area: 14 hectares (34 acres)
- Materials: Stone

Website
- sarkhejroza.org

Monument of National Importance
- Official name: Great Mosque; Great Tank, Palace & Harem; Pavilion; Roza of Baba Ishaq and Bawa Ganj Bhaksh; Tomb of Bibi (Rani) Rajbai; Tomb of Mahmud Begada; Tomb of Shaikh Ahmed Khattau Ganj Baksh
- Part of: Sarkhej Roza
- Reference no.: N-GJ-48 to 54

The Sarkhej Roza is a Sufi mosque and tomb complex located in the village of Makarba, 7 kilometres (4.3 mi) south-west of Ahmedabad in Gujarat state, India.

Although there are many rozas across Gujarat, the Sarkhej Roza complex is a Monument of National Importance. It was once where Sufi saint Shaikh Ahmed Ganj Baksh lived; the saint suggested that Sultan Ahmed Shah set up his capital on the banks of the Sabarmati, a few miles away from Sarkhej.

== Monuments ==
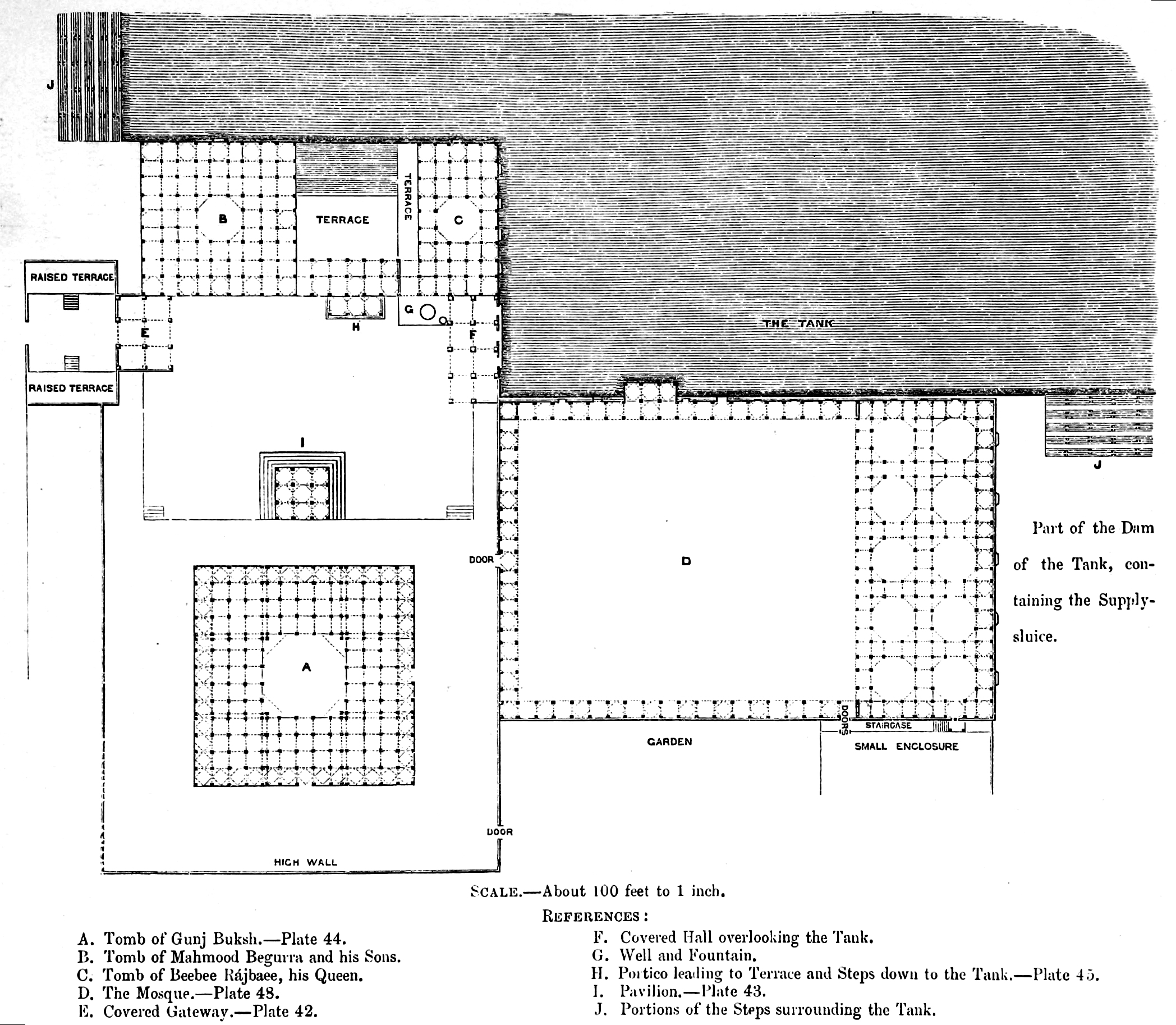
Plan of Sarkhej Roza

The architecture of the complex is credited to Azam and Muazzam Khan; two Persian brothers who are buried in the tomb near Vasna, Ahmedabad. The complex was originally spread over 29 hectares (72 acres), surrounded by elaborate gardens on all sides. Over time, human settlements came around it, reducing the gardens and shrinking the area to 14 hectares (34 acres).

Aḥmad K̲h̲attū Maghribī Ganjbakhsh was a Ṣūfī of the Maghribī order and was born into a noble family in Delhi in 1336. He was separated from his family in a dust storm and then was adopted by a Maghribī Ṣūfī named Bābā Isḥāq in the village of K̲h̲attū in Rajasthan. After the death of his teacher, Aḥmad K̲h̲attū travelled to Arabia, Iraq, and Iran. When the Mongol Tīmūr attacked Delhi Aḥmad K̲h̲attū was captured and later released. According to Badāʾūnī Aḥmad K̲h̲attū convinced Tīmūr to spare Delhi, who then took him back to Samarqand. Under the request of Ẓafar Khān, Aḥmad K̲h̲attū settled in Gujarat and began living in Sarkhej.

Shaikh Ahmed Khattu Ganj Bakhsh of Anhilwad Patan, the friend and adviser of Ahmad Shah I, retired to Sarkhej in his later life and died here in 1445. In his honour a tomb, begun in 1445 by Muhammad Shah II, was, in 1451, finished by his son Qutbuddin Ahmad Shah II. The next Sultan Mahmud Begada favored the site and expanded the complex greatly. He dug a large Sarkhej Lake, surrounded it with cut stone steps, built a splendid palace on its south-west corner, and finally, opposite to the Ganj Baksh's tomb, raised a mausoleum for himself and his family, where he, his son Muzaffar Shah II, his great-grandson Mahmud Shah III and his queen Rajbai are buried.

Entering the covered eastern gateway on the north bank of the Sarkhej Lake, the building to the right with a stone pavilion in front of it, is the mausoleum of Shaikh Ahmed Khattu Ganj Bakhsh. This, the largest of its kind in Gujarat, has along its whole length its sides filled with stone trellis work, and inside, round the tomb, has a cut-open metal screen. Across the courtyard on the left are two mausoleums with a connecting porch, the east mausoleum containing the tombs of Mahmud Begada, and of his son Saltan Muzaffar II, and the west, the tomb of Rajabai, Muzaffar's queen. Beyond the Ganj Bakhsh mausoleum is a courtyard, covering more than an acre of ground, surrounded by cloisters, with a mosque only slightly smaller than the Jama mosque. The want of minarets and the shallowness of its caves rather mar the outside effect. But inside 'it is the perfection of simple grace unrivaled in India except by the Moti mosque at Agra.' Looking across the lake the ruined buildings at the south-west corner are Mahmud Begada's palace and harem. The Sarkhej Lake covers 6.9 hectares (17 acres); is oblong in shape, is surrounded by flights of stone steps, and has a richly decorated supply sluice.

Besides the chief group of remains, the country round is studded with mosques and other old buildings. A little to the south of the lake is a small whitewashed tomb, the burial place of Baba Ali Sher, a saint held in higher respect even than Ganj Bakhsh. Close by are the remains of Fatehwadi or Victory Garden, laid out in 1584 by Abdul Rahim Khan-I-Khana (1583-1590) to mark his defeat of Muzaffar Shah III, the last of the Gujarat Sultanate. In the 17th century Sarkhej was so famous for its indigo that in 1620 the Dutch established a factory in the village.

== Architecture ==
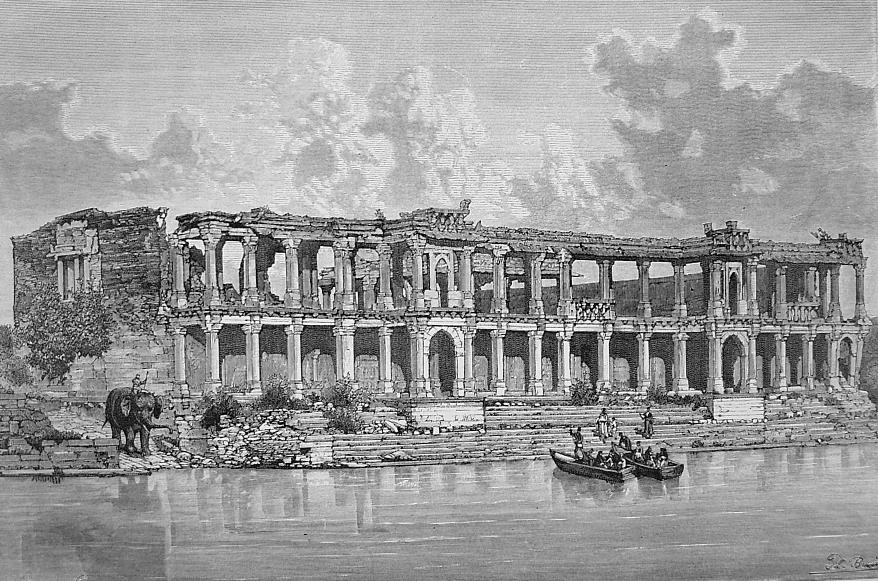
"The gallery that opens into the Tombs of the Queens" (15th century)

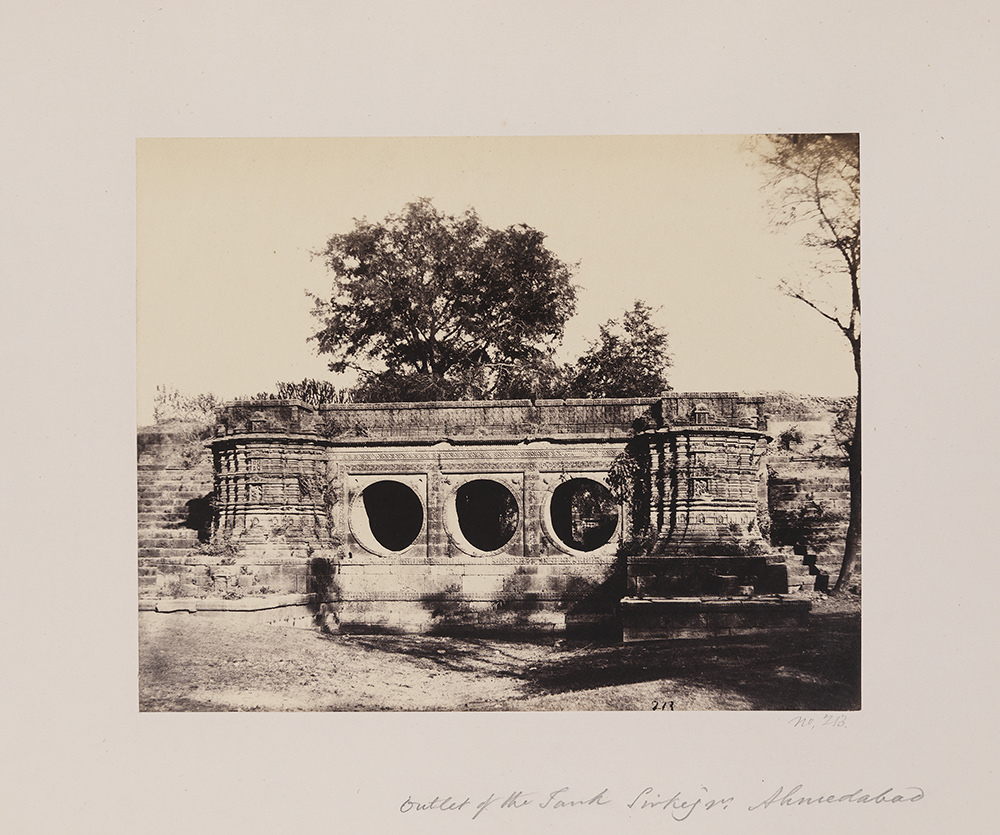
Tank outlet, 1855

Like many monuments built during that period, the Sarkhej Roza fused both non-Indian and Indian principles of architecture. While the ringed domes, the profusion of pillars and brackets can be claimed to follow the Islamic west Asian genre (even though they can also be found in Indian architecture itself since much before), much of the ornamentation and motifs have Indian Hindu designs. Most of the buildings do not have arches and depend on pierced stone trellises for stability. In its architecture, Sarkhej Roza is an example of the early Islamic architectural culture of the region, which fused Islamic stylistic influences from Persia with Indian Hindu and Jain features to form a composite Indo-Saracenic architectural style. The mosque, with its courtyard, creates a religious milieu; the royal connection is made through the tombs and palaces; the great tank, platforms and pavilions were used by the common man.

The complex is called "Acropolis of Ahmedabad", due to 20th century architect Le Corbusier's comparison of this complex's design to the Acropolis of Athens.

== In popular culture ==
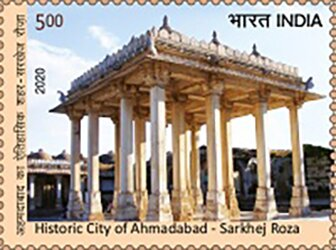
Stamp of India, 2020, depicting Sarkhej Roza, Ahmedabad, from the "List of World Heritage Sites in India – III (Cultural Sites)" commemorative series.

Some scenes of the 2017 Hindi film Raees were shot in Sarkhej Roza.

== See also ==
- Islam in India
- List of mosques in India
- List of Monuments of National Importance in Ahmedabad district
