= Grand Turk (disambiguation) =

Grand Turk is an island of the Turks and Caicos Islands.

Grand Turk may also refer to:

- Grand Turk (Colorado), a mountain in Colorado, US
- Grand Turk (frigate) or Étoile du Roy, three-masted sixth-rate frigate laid down in 1996
- Grand Turk International Airport, Cockburn Town, Grand Turk Island, Turks and Caicos Islands
- Battle of Grand Turk, a 1783 battle of the American Revolution
- Ottoman sultan or Grand Turk
- Rufus Wilmot Griswold or Grand Turk (1815–1857), American author
- HMS Grand Turk, a Royal Navy ship
- Grand Turk, a 300-ton privateering tradeship owned by Elias Hasket Derby
- Grand Turk, a Ku Klux Klan title

== See also ==
- Mehmet the Conqueror, who had an epithet "Grand Turk" separate from just being the sultan
- Suleiman the Magnificent, who had an epithet "Grand Turk" separate from just being the sultan
- Turk (disambiguation)
- Mughal-e-Azam (disambiguation) (lit. 'Grand Mughal')
