= Mughal-e-Azam (disambiguation) =

Mughal-e-Azam (lit. 'Great Mughal' or 'Grand Mughal') is a 1960 Indian epic historical drama film by K. Asif.

It may also refer to:

- Mughal-e-Azam (soundtrack), soundtrack to the film by Naushad
- Mughal-e-Azam (musical), a Broadway-style musical based on the 1960 film
- Maan Gaye Mughal-e-Azam, a 2008 Indian film

== See also ==
- Mughal (disambiguation)
- Azam (disambiguation)
- Grand Turk (disambiguation)
