= Azzam =

Azzam is a name of Arabic origin (Arabic: عزام, and may refer to:

== People ==
=== Given name ===
- Azzam al-Ahmad, Palestinian politician
- Azzam al-Gharib, Syrian politician
- Azzam Shawwa, Palestinian economist
- Azzam Sleit (born 1966), Jordanian engineer and politician
- Azzam Tamimi, British-Palestinian academic and activist

=== Surname ===
- Abdul Rahman Hassan Azzam (also known as Azzam Pasha), Egyptian diplomat who is known for making the famous Azzam Pasha quotation
- Abdullah Yusuf Azzam, Palestinian Sunni Islamic militant, scholar, and theologian
- Ahmad Azzam, Syrian footballer
- Amin Azzam, American clinical professor
- Azzam Azzam, person who was convicted of spying for Israel
- Bob Azzam, Lebanese singer
- Fadi Azzam, Syrian novelist and poet
- Husam Azzam, Palestinian athlete and paralympian
- Mansour Fadlallah Azzam, Syrian politician
- Samira Azzam, Palestinian writer, broadcaster, and translator

=== Nickname ===
- Adam Yahiye Gadahn, spokesman for Al-Qaeda, also known as Azzam the American

== Other ==
- Azzam (2011 yacht), a yacht participating in the 2011–12 Volvo Ocean Race
- Azzam (2013 yacht), Emirati luxury yacht in service since 2013
- Azzam (2014 yacht), the winner of the 2014–15 Volvo Ocean Race
- Azzam Publications, a British publishing house.

== See also ==
- Azam (disambiguation)
