= Mohammed Abdullah Azam =

- Born: 1970 (age 55–56)
- Criminal charges: "Collected information of a kind likely to be useful to a person committing or preparing an act of terrorism"

Mohammed Abdullah Azam is a citizen of the United Kingdom who was charged under its counter-terrorism laws in 2002, and convicted in 2003. A security official stated that Azam was charged because he was collecting information "of a kind likely to be useful to a person committing or preparing an act of terrorism, or had in his possession documents or records containing information of that kind."

The Associated Press reported that Mohammed Abdullah Azam was a computer programmer, and that three other men who were arrested when his flat was raided were released without charge.

Azam's nationality is not known. The Guardian quoted Azam's brother who said, "He is innocent. This is part of the ongoing targeting of Muslims in Britain since September 11. Muslims in this country should be protected. He is British - born and bred in this country."

An appendix of a report by the Nixon Center of those convicted of terrorist crimes asserts he was convicted on 19 March 2003.
