= Sheykh Hoseyn, Khuzestan =

Sheykh Hoseyn شيخ حسين
- Village
- Location within Iran
- Coordinates: 31°46′26″N 48°41′10″E
- Country: Iran
- Province: Khuzestan
- County: Shushtar
- Bakhsh: Shadravan
- Rural District: Shoaybiyeh-ye Gharbi

Population (2006)
  - Total: 960
- Time zone: UTC+3:30 (IRST)
  - Summer (DST): UTC+4:30 (IRDT)

Sheykh Hoseyn (Persian: شيخ حسين, also Romanized as Sheykh Ḩoseyn; also known as Abū ‘Az̄ām, Abū ‘Az̧ām, and Sheykh Ḩoseynī) is a village in Shoaybiyeh-ye Gharbi Rural District, Shadravan District, Shushtar County, Khuzestan Province, Iran. At the 2006 census, its population was 960, in 160 families.
