= Mian Muhammad Azam =

Pakistani politician

Member of the Provincial Assembly of the Punjab
- In office 2008 – 31 May 2018

Personal details
- Born: 1 January 1952 (age 74)
- Party: PTI (2018-present)
- Other political affiliations: PMLN (2013-2018); PML(Q) (2013-2008); IND (1997-1990); PPP (1980-1990)

Mian Muhammad Azam Chela is a Pakistani politician who was a Member of the Provincial Assembly of the Punjab, from 2008 to May 2018.

== Early life ==
He was born on 1 January 1952.

== Political career ==
He ran for the seat of the Provincial Assembly of the Punjab as a candidate of Pakistan Peoples Party (PPP) from Constituency PP-68 (Jhang-VIII) in the 1988 Pakistani general election but was unsuccessful. He received 102 votes and lost the seat to an independent candidate, Sajjad Ahmad.

He ran for the seat of the Provincial Assembly of the Punjab as a candidate of Pakistan Democratic Alliance (PDA) from Constituency PP-68 (Jhang-VIII) in the 1990 Pakistani general election but was unsuccessful. He received 20,522 votes and lost the seat to Ghazanfar Ali Khan, a candidate of Islami Jamhoori Ittehad (IJI).

He ran for the seat of the Provincial Assembly of the Punjab as an independent candidate from Constituency PP-68 (Jhang-VIII) in the 1997 Pakistani general election but was unsuccessful. He received 631 votes and lost the seat to an independent candidate, Ghazanfar Ali Khan.

He was elected to the Provincial Assembly of the Punjab as a candidate of Pakistan Muslim League (Q) (PML-Q) from Constituency PP-82 (Jhang-X) in the 2008 Pakistani general election. He received 40,882 votes and defeated an independent candidate, Faisal Hayat Jaboana.

He was re-elected to the Provincial Assembly of the Punjab as a candidate of Pakistan Muslim League (N) (PML-N) from Constituency PP-82 (Jhang-X) in the 2013 Pakistani general election. He received 37,356 votes and defeated an independent candidate, Ghazanfar Ali Khan.
