= Khvoshinan-e Vosta =

Village in Kermanshah, Iran

Khvoshinan-e Vosta خوشينان وسطي
- Village
- Location within Iran
- Coordinates: 34°31′36″N 46°53′20″E
- Country: Iran
- Province: Kermanshah
- County: Kermanshah
- Bakhsh: Central
- Rural District: Miyan Darband

Population (2006)
  - Total: 126
- Time zone: UTC+3:30 (IRST)
  - Summer (DST): UTC+4:30 (IRDT)

Khvoshinan-e Vosta (Persian: خوشينان وسطي, also Romanized as Khvoshīnān-e Vosţá and Khūshīnān-e Vosţá; also known as Khoshnīān-e Vasaţī, Khowshīnah Tappeh, Khushinān-i-Tappeh, Khushinān-i-Tepe, Khvoshī Nān-e Tappeh, Khvoshīnān-e Tappeh Vasaţī, and Khvoshīnān Tappeh) is a village in Miyan Darband Rural District, in the Central District of Kermanshah County, Kermanshah Province, Iran. At the 2006 census, its population was 126, in 34 families.
