= Parveen Azam Ali =

British nurse and academic (born 1979)

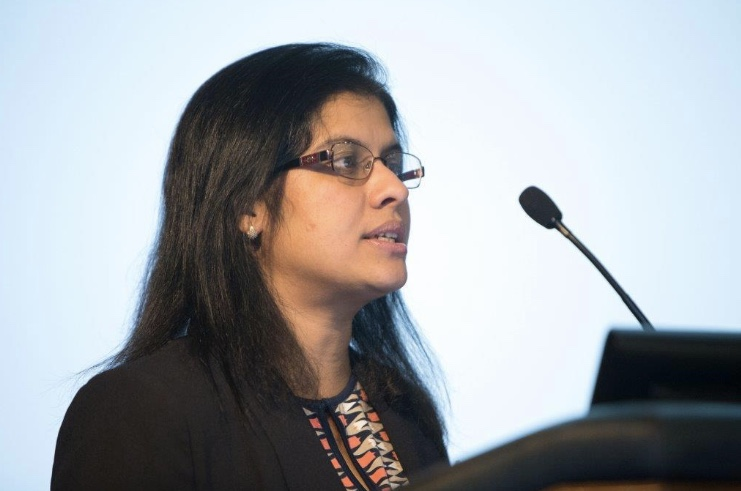
- Born: 4 April 1979 (age 47)
- Citizenship: British

Academic background
- Education: Aga Khan University (BScN, MScN); University of Sheffield (PhD)
- Thesis: Managing or Not Managing Expectations: A Grounded Theory of Intimate Partner Violence from the Perspective of Pakistani People (2012)

Academic work
- Discipline: Nursing
- Sub-discipline: Gender-based violence; health inequalities
- Institutions: University of Sheffield; Doncaster and Bassetlaw Teaching Hospitals NHS Foundation Trust
- Website: www.sheffield.ac.uk/ahpnm/people/nursing-and-midwifery/parveen-ali

Parveen Azam Ali (born 4 April 1979) is a British nurse and academic of Pakistani origin. She is Professor of Nursing and Gender Based Violence at the University of Sheffield, with a joint clinical appointment at Doncaster and Bassetlaw Teaching Hospitals NHS Foundation Trust. Since 2020 she has served as editor-in-chief of International Nursing Review, the official journal of the International Council of Nurses.

== Education ==
Ali was educated at the Aga Khan University in Karachi, where she completed a Bachelor of Science in Nursing and a Master of Science in Nursing. She subsequently undertook doctoral studies at the University of Sheffield's School of Health and Related Research (ScHARR).

== Career ==
Ali joined the University of Sheffield's School of Nursing and Midwifery as a lecturer in 2014, having previously held a lecturing post at the University of Hull. She subsequently rose to a chair in the renamed School of Allied Health Professions, Nursing and Midwifery, where she leads the MMedSci in Advanced Nursing Studies and serves as a Deputy Director of Research and Innovation.

Her research focuses on gender-based violence — particularly intimate partner violence — health inequalities, consanguinity and genetics, and ethnic disparities in healthcare access and outcomes. She has served as Deputy Chair of the NIHR Health Services and Delivery Research (HSDR) Funding Committee.

=== Editorial work ===
Ali was an associate editor of Nursing Open until 2021 and is a contributor to The Conversation. She has been a member of The Lancet relating to nursing.

== Honours and awards ==
In 2014, Ali was one of six recipients of the Royal College of Nursing's Mary Seacole leadership awards, which supported her work on health inequalities in Black, Asian and minority ethnic communities.

In 2017, she received the Emerging Nurse Researcher Award from the European region of Sigma Theta Tau International.

In 2020, the International Council of Nurses recognised her radio outreach to the Pakistani community of South Yorkshire on health-related matters as part of its International Nurses Day campaign.

In 2022, she received the Asian Women of Achievement Award in the Professions category.

In 2023, she was elected a Fellow of the American Academy of Nursing as part of the academy's 2023 class of new fellows. In 2025, she was admitted ad eundem as a Fellow of the Royal College of Surgeons in Ireland Faculty of Nursing and Midwifery.

Ali is also a Senior Fellow of the Advance HE (formerly Higher Education Academy), a Fellow of the Faculty of Public Health, and a Fellow of the Royal Society of Arts.

== Selected publications ==
- Gul, Raisa B.; Ali, Parveen A. (January 2010). "Clinical trials: the challenge of recruitment and retention of participants". Journal of Clinical Nursing. 19 (1–2): 227–233. doi:10.1111/j.1365-2702.2009.03041.x. PMID 20500260.
- Ali, Parveen Azam; Naylor, Paul B. (November 2013). "Intimate partner violence: a narrative review of the feminist, social and ecological explanations for its causation". Aggression and Violent Behavior. 18 (6): 611–619. doi:10.1016/j.avb.2013.07.009.
- Ali, Parveen Azam; Panther, Wendy (25 June 2008). "Professional development and the role of mentorship". Nursing Standard. 22 (42): 35–39. doi:10.7748/ns2008.06.22.42.35.c6579. PMID 18649718.
