= Azam Mosque of Qom =

Shi'ite mosque in Qom, Iran

- مسجد اعظم قم
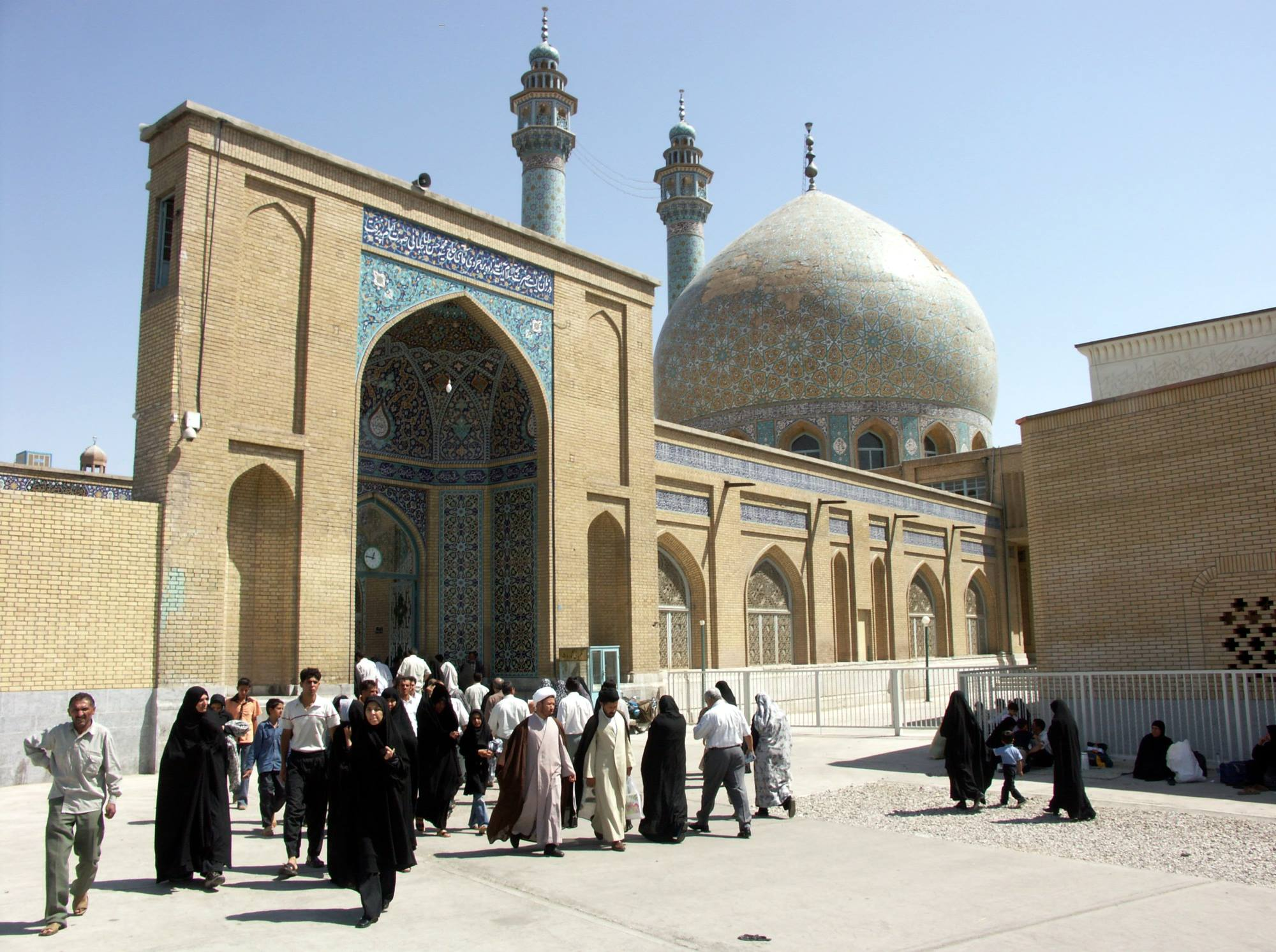
- Worshippers outside the mosque in 2005

- Location of the mosque in Iran

Religion
- Affiliation: Shia Islam
- Ecclesiastical or organizational status: Mosque
- Status: Active

Location
- Location: Qom, Qom Province
- Country: Iran
- Interactive map of Azam Mosque of Qom
- Coordinates: 34°38′31″N 50°52′41″E

Architecture
- Type: Mosque architecture
- Style: Pahlavi
- Founder: Seyyed Hossein Borujerdi
- Groundbreaking: 22 June 1954
- Completed: 1961

Specifications
- Dome: One (maybe more)
- Dome height (outer): 35 m (115 ft)
- Dome dia. (outer): 30 m (98 ft)
- Minaret: Two
- Minaret height: 45 m (148 ft)

Iran National Heritage List
- Official name: Azam Mosque of Qom
- Type: Built
- Designated: 29 January 2006
- Part of: Holy Shrine of Hazrat Ma'soomeh
- Reference no.: 14000
- Conservation organization: Cultural Heritage, Handicrafts and Tourism Organization of Iran

The Azam Mosque of Qom (Persian: مسجد اعظم قم, romanized: Masjid-i A'zam; Arabic: مسجد الأعظم), also known as the Qom A'zam Mosque and as the Hazrat Fatimah Mosque, is a Shi'ite mosque located in the city of Qom, in the province of Qom, Iran. Completed in 1961, the mosque was built by Seyyed Hossein Borujerdi, the grand Shia Marja', and is located adjacent to the Holy Shrine of Hazrat Ma'soomeh.

The mosque was added to the Iran National Heritage List on 29 January 2006, administered by the Cultural Heritage, Handicrafts and Tourism Organization of Iran.

== Architecture ==
The foundation stone of the mosque was laid on 22 June 1954, the birthday of Ali al-Ridha, the eighth Imam of Shia Muslims. Completed in 1961, the mosque was designed on Islamic architecture principles in the Pahlavi style. The mosque has four prayer halls and three towering balconies. The diameter of the dome is 30 metres (98 ft) and it is 15 metres (49 ft) above the height of the roof, and 35 metres (115 ft) from the basement of the mosque. The minarets are 25 metres (82 ft) above the height of the roof, and 45 metres (148 ft) from the basement of the mosque. The upper part of each minaret is 5 metres (16 ft) high. The mosque has special section and used to call to prayers (A'zaan). A towering clock tower with a big clock is located in the north of the mosque and this tower can be seen from all the four sides of the mosque.

The fiftieth anniversary of the death of Seyyed Hossein Borujerdi was commemorated at the mosque.

== Gallery ==
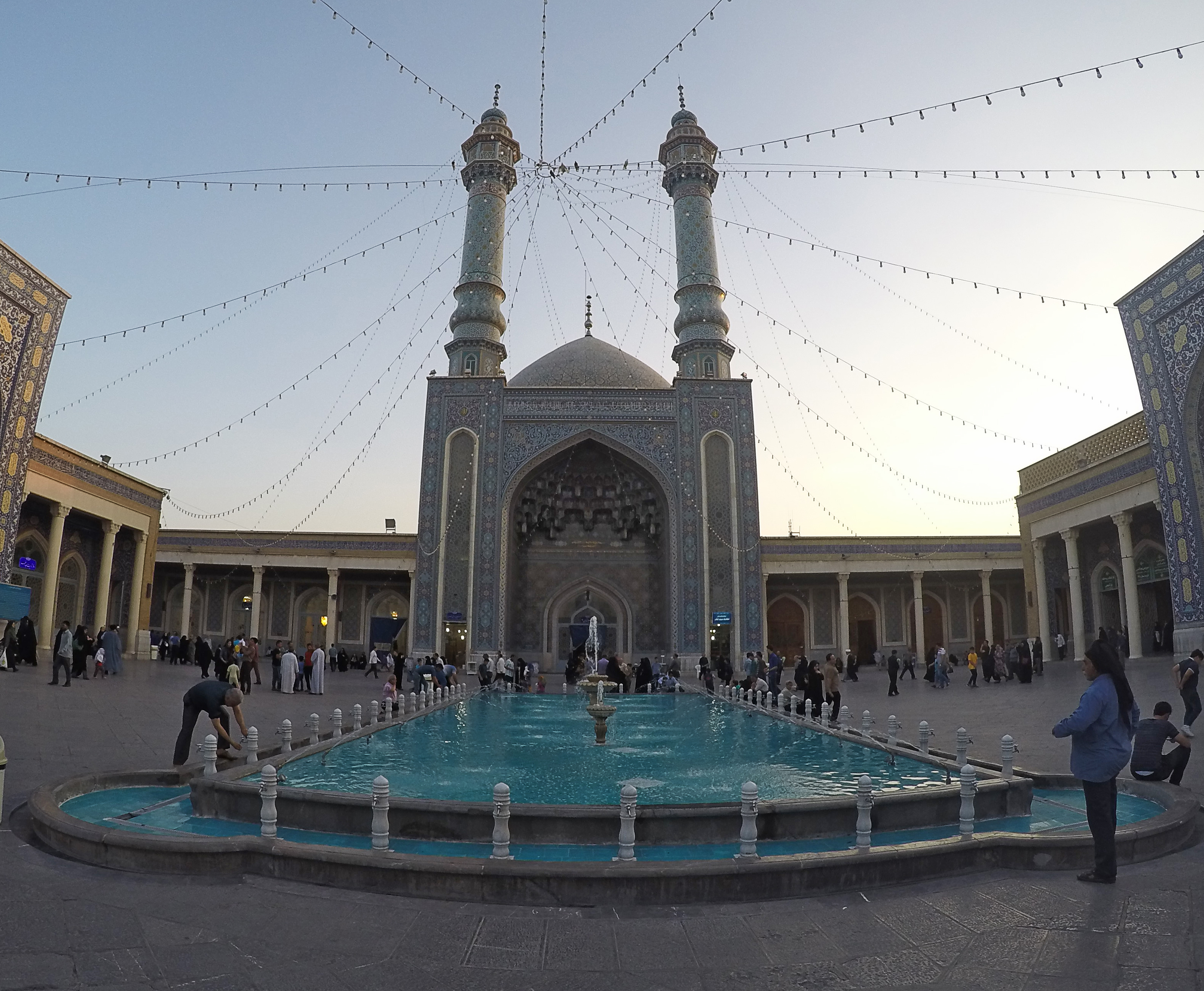
Minarets, dome and sahn

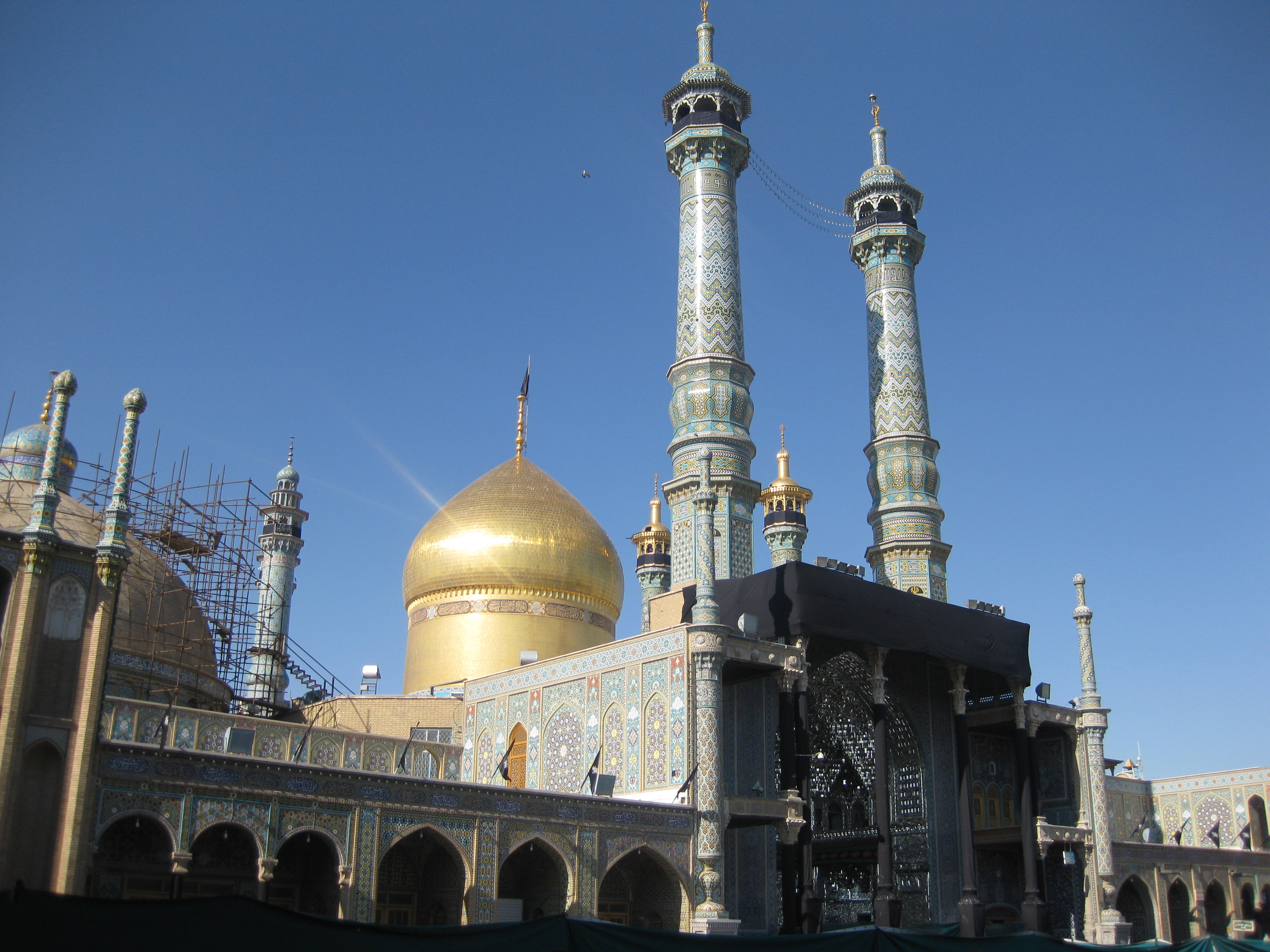
The mosque minarets, with the adjacent shrine's golden dome

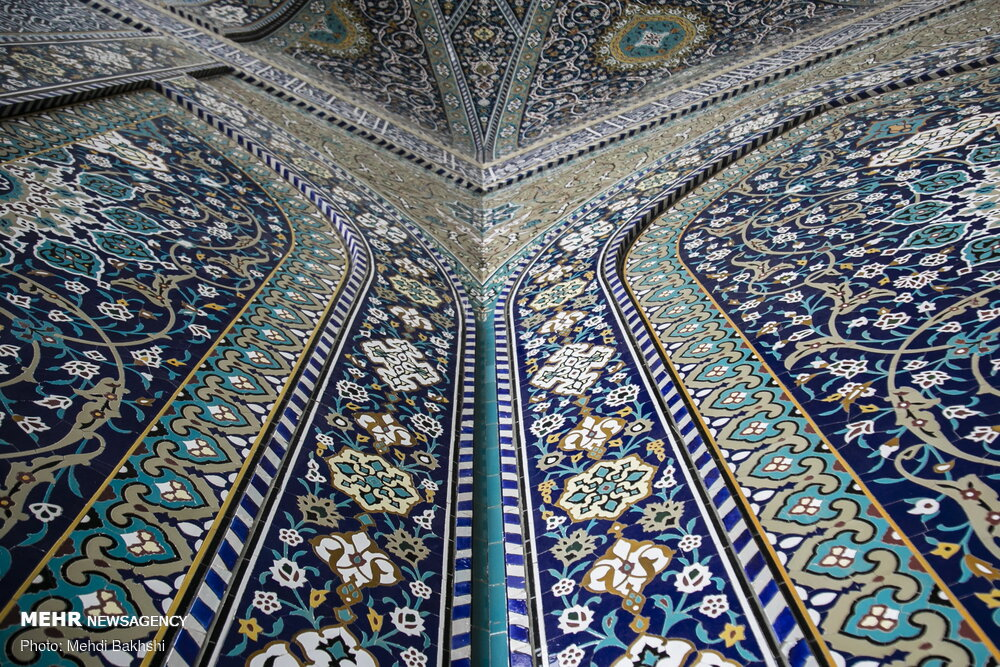
Intricate designs on the mosque interior, from Mehr News

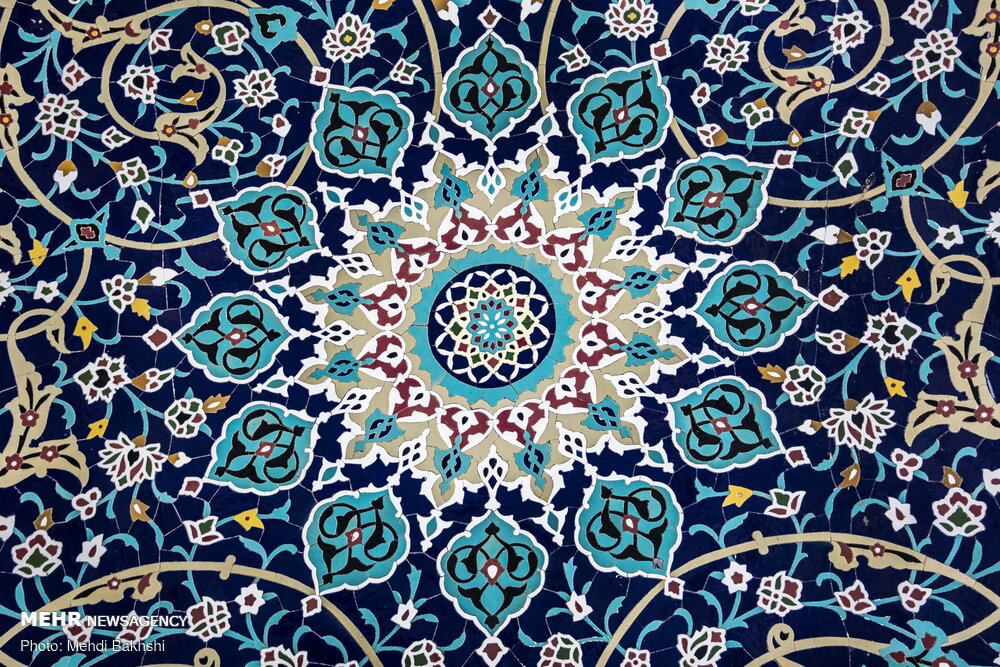
Intricate designs on the mosque interior, from Mehr News

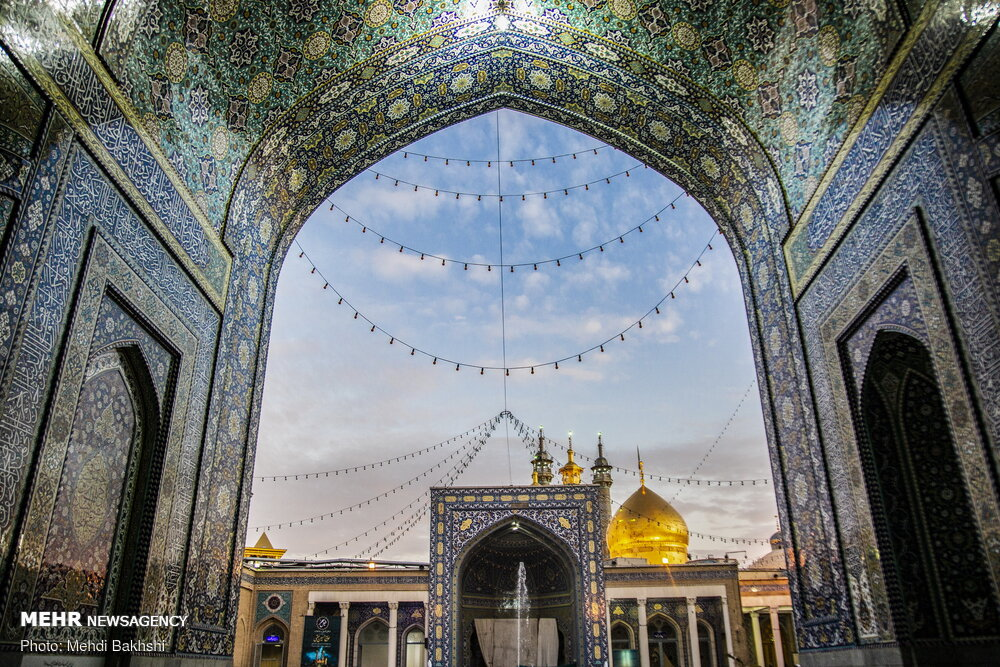
Intricate designs on the iwan, from Mehr News

== See also ==
- Shia Islam in Iran
- List of mosques in Iran
- Holiest sites in Islam
