= Azizullah =

Azizullah (Arabic: عزیز الله) is an Arabic male name built on the words Aziz and Allah, it may refer to:

== Given name ==
- Azizollah Zarghami (1884–1978), Iranian Major General
- Azizullah (born 1993), Pakistani cricketer
- Aziz Ullah Haidari (1968–2001), Afghan journalist
- Azizullah Karzai, Afghan diplomat
- Azizullah Lodin (1939–2015), Afghan politician
- Azizallah Hamidnejad, Iranian Director
- Azizallah Honoramouz, Iranian Actor
- Azizollah Khoshvaght (1926–2013), Iranian-Azeri Cleric
