= Fakhr Azam Wazir =

Pakistani politician

MPA Fakhr Azam Wazir

Member of the Khyber Pakhtunkhwa Assembly
- Constituency: PK-71 (Bannu-II)
- In office 2013–2018

Personal details
- Party: Pakistan Peoples Party Parliamentarians
- Occupation: Politician

Fakhr Azam Wazir is a Pakistani politician, who served as a member of the Khyber Pakhtunkhwa Assembly from 2013 to 2018, belonging to the Pakistan Peoples Party Parliamentarians. He also served as member of different committees.

== Political career ==
Fakhr was elected as the member of the Khyber Pakhtunkhwa Assembly on ticket of Pakistan Peoples Party Parliamentarians from PK-71 (Bannu-II) in the 2013 Pakistani general election.
