= Makarba =

- Census town
- Location in Gujarat, India Makarba (India)
- Coordinates: 22.99411°N 72.507629°E
- Country: India
- State: Gujarat
- District: Ahmedabad

Population (2001)
  - Total: 18,090

Languages
  - Official: Gujarati, Hindi
- Time zone: UTC+5:30 (IST)
- Vehicle registration: GJ
- Website: gujaratindia.com

Makarba is a census town in Ahmedabad district in the Indian state of Gujarat.

== Demographics ==
As of 2001 India census, Makarba had a population of 18,090. Males constitute 53% of the population and females 47%. Makarba has an average literacy rate of 60%, higher than the national average of 59.5%: male literacy is 69%, and female literacy is 51%. In Makarba, 16% of the population is under 6 years of age.
