= Azam Jahi Mills, Warangal =

Indian company

Azam Jahi Mills (A.J. Mills) was a textile manufacturing company established in Warangal district of the Kingdom of Hyderabad. It was founded in 1934 by the 7th Nizam of Hyderabad, Mir Osman Ali Khan, and named after his eldest son, Prince Azam Jah.

In 1974, the National Textile Corporation (NTC), a government-owned entity responsible for managing sick textile mills in India, took over the company. Later, in 2008, most of the mill's land (around 200 acres) was transferred to the Kakatiya Urban Development Authority (KUDA), which subdivided and sold it in plots. The NTC retained approximately 30 acres, on which it proposed establishing an Apparel Park in response to public demand.

== See also ==
- Nizam Sugar Factory
- Nizam's Guaranteed State Railway
- Hyderabad Deccan Cigarette Factory
