= Elias Hasket Derby =

American merchant

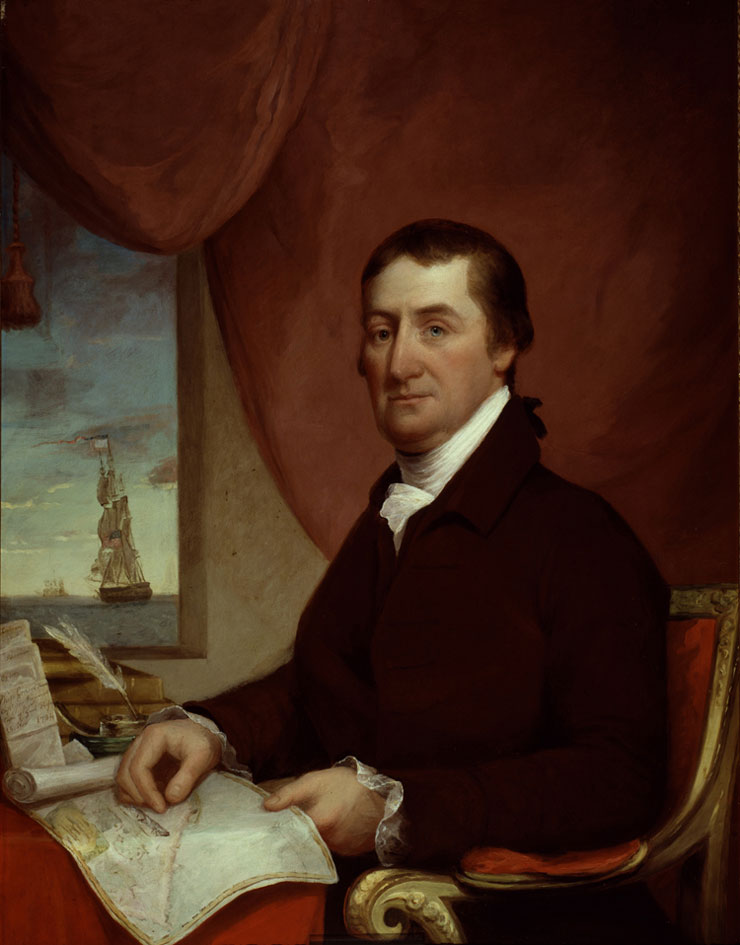
- c. 1800–25 portrait by James Frothingham
- Born: August 16, 1739; Salem, Massachusetts
- Died: September 8, 1799 (aged 60); Salem, Massachusetts
- Occupation: Merchant
- Known for: Owner of the first New England vessel to trade with China
- Spouse: Elizabeth Crowninshield

Elias Hasket Derby (August 16, 1739 — September 8, 1799) was an American merchant based in Salem, Massachusetts who owned or held shares in numerous privateers. The crews of these ships took more than 150 prizes during the American Revolution, and the sale of the prizes resulted in great wealth to be shared. Derby was in business with his father, who died at the end of the war.

After the war, Derby converted his large, swift Grand Turk to commercial use, and sent it as the first New England vessel to trade directly with China. By specializing in the East Indies trade, Derby became not only one of the wealthiest and most celebrated traders of the post-Revolutionary period in Salem, Massachusetts, but at one point reputedly the richest man in the United States. He died in Salem in September, 1799, aged 60.

== Biography ==
=== Early life ===
Born in Salem in 1739, Elias Hasket Derby was the son of Richard Derby (1712–1783), a sea captain and merchant, and his wife. This son never went to sea but entered his father's business at a young age, starting in the counting house. The younger Derby was in charge of bookkeeping from 1760 until the start of the Revolution. By 1760, his father owned a fleet of at least thirteen vessels engaged in coastal, West Indian and Southern Atlantic trade. The Derbys, like many merchants in Salem at the start of the Revolution, both supported and profited from the war.

From all accounts, Elias Hasket Derby was deeply involved in equipping privateers, or had shares in as many as half the privateers (one hundred and fifty-eight in all) that hailed from Salem. The Derbys' Grand Turk, launched in May 1781, was Salem's largest privateer, and became the most successful; it captured seventeen prizes between 1781 and 1782 in the last years of the war.

Even before the close of the Revolution (Richard Derby died in 1783), Derby the younger (hereafter referred to as Derby in this article) was trading on his own and also in partnership with his brothers. By the time peace was declared, Derby's contemporaries claimed that in all of New England his fortune was second only to that of the Cabots of Beverly.

After Derby's mother died, his father married again, to the widow Sarah Langley Hersey (1714–1790). In his will Richard Derby bequeathed a large fortune to Sarah. She used much of it to found and endow Derby Academy in Hingham, Massachusetts.

=== Privateers ===
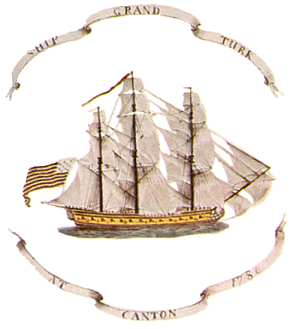
The first Grand Turk ship

On August 19, 1776, Derby acted as a proponent merchant agent on behalf of Commander/Captain Joseph White and his marines of the sloop Revenge, in a prize case related to their capture of the brigantine Anna Maria, a British vessel laden with a variety of goods.

The Derby family firm commissioned construction of Grand Turk for privateering. She was of 300 tons burthen and was designed for speed, while still having a good cargo capacity. Derby had sent one of his captains, James Gibaut, to Hanover, Massachusetts to supervise the construction by Thomas Barstow, at his Two Oaks yard. The ship was launched May 1781, fitted for 28 guns. Grand Turk was chiefly paid for by barter, with goods (rum, butter) being exchanged for the labor and materials. The materials used for her construction were of the best quality, and Grand Turk was copper-bottomed. As a privateer, she captured 25 ships, and great wealth resulted for Derby from the sales of the prizes.

Immediately following the war, coastal and international trade were depressed. The privateers built during the Revolution were substantially larger and faster than earlier Salem ships. They represented an important economic resource that were converted to peacetime use. Derby was instrumental in initiating new trade with Russia, the Baltic, Europe and, in 1784, the East Indies. The early forays and specialization in the East Indian markets by Salem merchants largely resulted in their remarkable, if temporary, prosperity, and supported growth in the city.

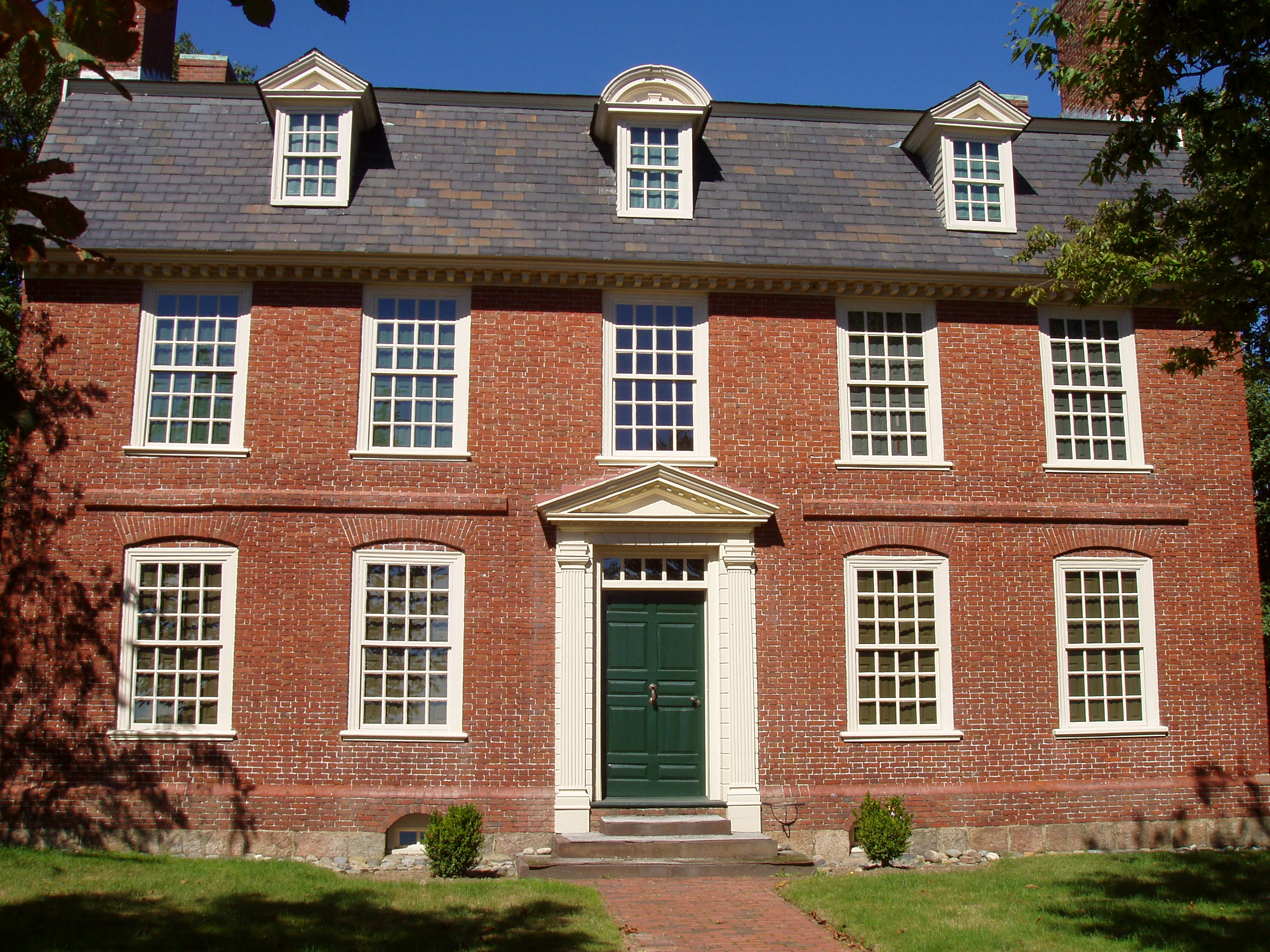
Derby House

In November 1784, Derby sent the Grand Turk (ship) under Capt. Jonathan Ingersoll to the Cape of Good Hope. The voyage was successful, and in December 1785 the Grand Turk under Ebenezer West, master, and William Vans, supercargo, again cleared Salem bound for the Cape. West and Vans arrived at the Cape of Good Hope after a passage of 82 days. But they found the markets there less favorable than they had anticipated. Vans and West continued on to Mauritius, at the time under French control and recently opened as a way station to United States vessels. The Grand Turk was apparently the first American vessel to call there.

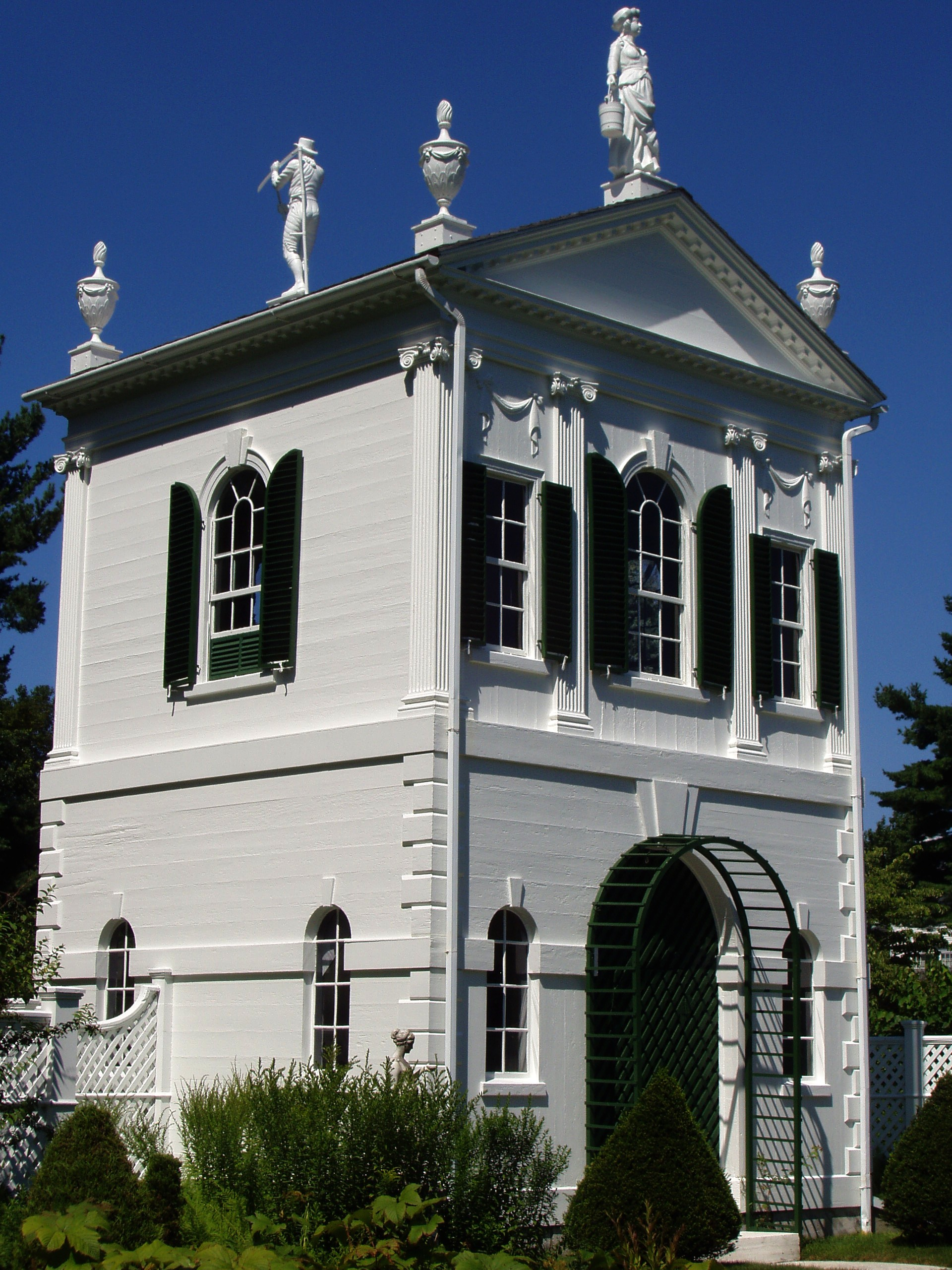
Derby Summer House

West and Vans wrote Derby that they were again "Miserable disappointed in the demand for our Cargo." Subsequently, Randall Ouery and Sebier de la Chataignerais, French merchants of Mauritius who had purchased the Turk's cargo, offered a solution. They contracted with the Grand Turk to take a cargo to Canton and thence on to Boston. Vans and West wrote to Derby to inform him of the new plan, but he would have known of it only afterward.

The deal, however, did not go off as planned. Sebier and Ouery were undercapitalized, and once they paid the many "charges & duties & presents" at Canton, they could not afford to continue the voyage to Boston. Vans and West purchased a cargo on Derby's behalf. The Grand Turk was one of five American ships and the first from Salem to reach Canton during the 1786 season. She reached Salem harbor on 22 May 1787, the first New England ship to trade directly with China.

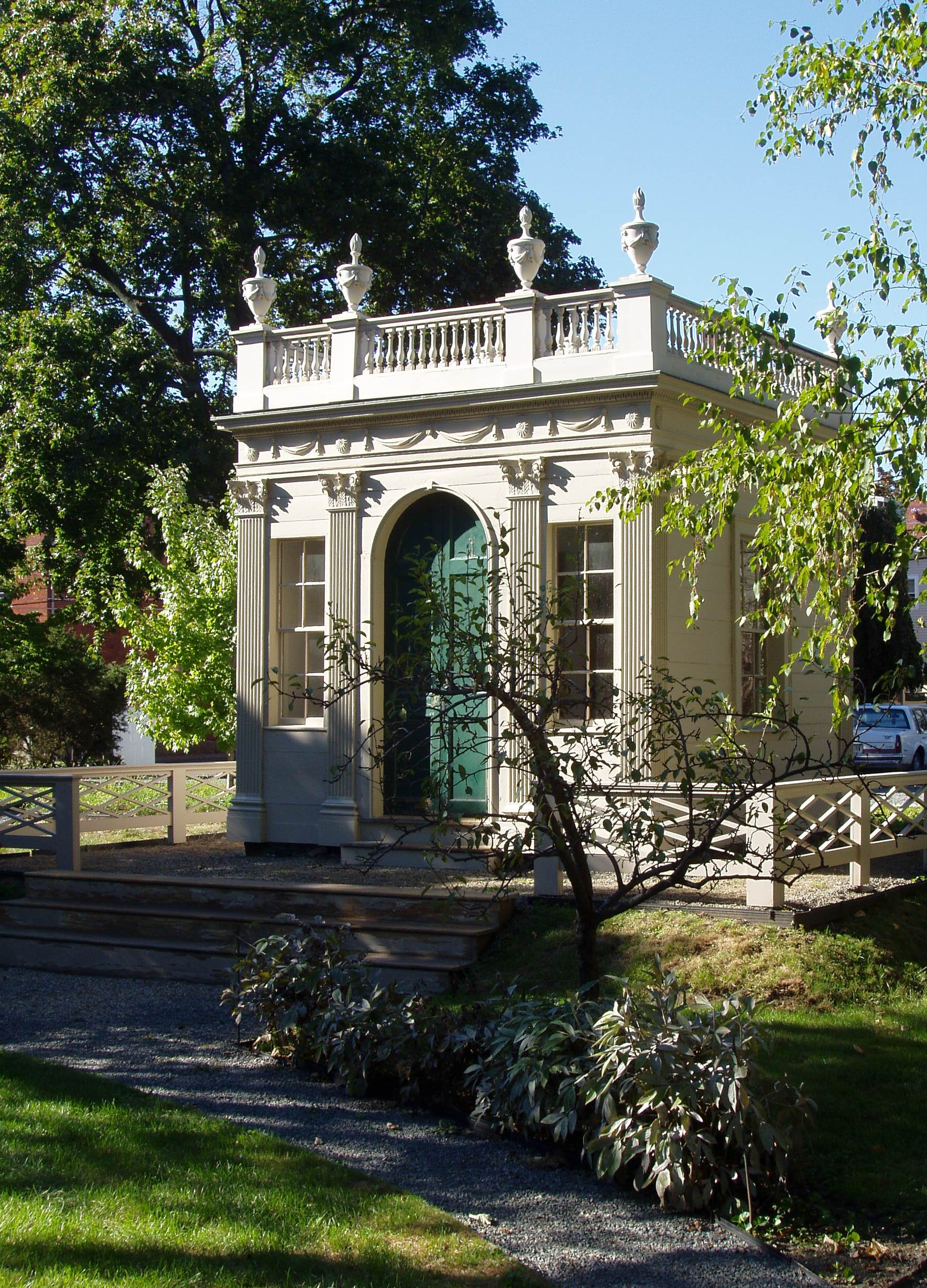
The Derby-Beebe Summer House in Salem; it is now owned by the Peabody Essex Museum.

=== Trade with China ===
Initially, Derby, like most Americans, must have been optimistic about the trade with China. In 1789, at least sixteen American vessels landed at Canton. Derby owned four of these vessels — Astrea, Atlantic, Light Horse, and Three Sisters. Initially only Astrea and Three Sisters were intended to go to China. Their captains were instructed to work in tandem: they went first to Batavia of the Dutch East Indies and solicited additional freight there for Canton. Other American ships also went to Canton. After the flurry of the 1789 season, no Salem ship called at Canton again until 1797. Three years into the American China trade, the market was already glutted with tea. In addition, the cost of doing business with the Chinese and the length of the voyage seriously undermined American profits.

After the return of the Astrea and the Light Horse in 1790, Derby never sent another ship to Canton. Meanwhile, he was conducting business at the Isle of France at Mauritius, Batavia, Sumatra, and India in East Asia. He also maintained an extensive commerce with Europe, the West Indies, and Atlantic islands. Between 1786 and 1800, as many as one tenth of all American vessels touching at Mauritius were owned by Derby. Most of these vessels were en route to or from other ports.

Derby's namesake son, Elias Hasket Derby Jr. (1766–1826), known as Hasket, followed him into the family business. Derby sent Hasket to manage the firm's eastern trade from a base in Mauritius. In 1788, Hasket traveled to Bombay with two ships, where he purchased a cargo of textiles. Hasket continued to trade in India throughout the late 1780s, eventually returning to Salem in 1791. The Derbys entered the India textile trade in earnest, sending no fewer that five ships there over the next four years.

Derby has been referred to as "King Derby" or as America's first millionaire. However, it is improbable that he was known as King Derby during his lifetime. Nathaniel Hawthorne bestowed this title on him in his novel The Scarlet Letter (1850) (p. 4). As for being America's first millionaire, Derby was one of a number of highly successful Massachusetts merchants of the period.

=== Family ===
The families of the early merchant barons of Salem intermarried, increasing their wealth. In 1761 Derby married Elizabeth Crowninshield, sister of George Crowninshield, his brother-in-law. Derby's sister Mary had already married George Crowninshield.

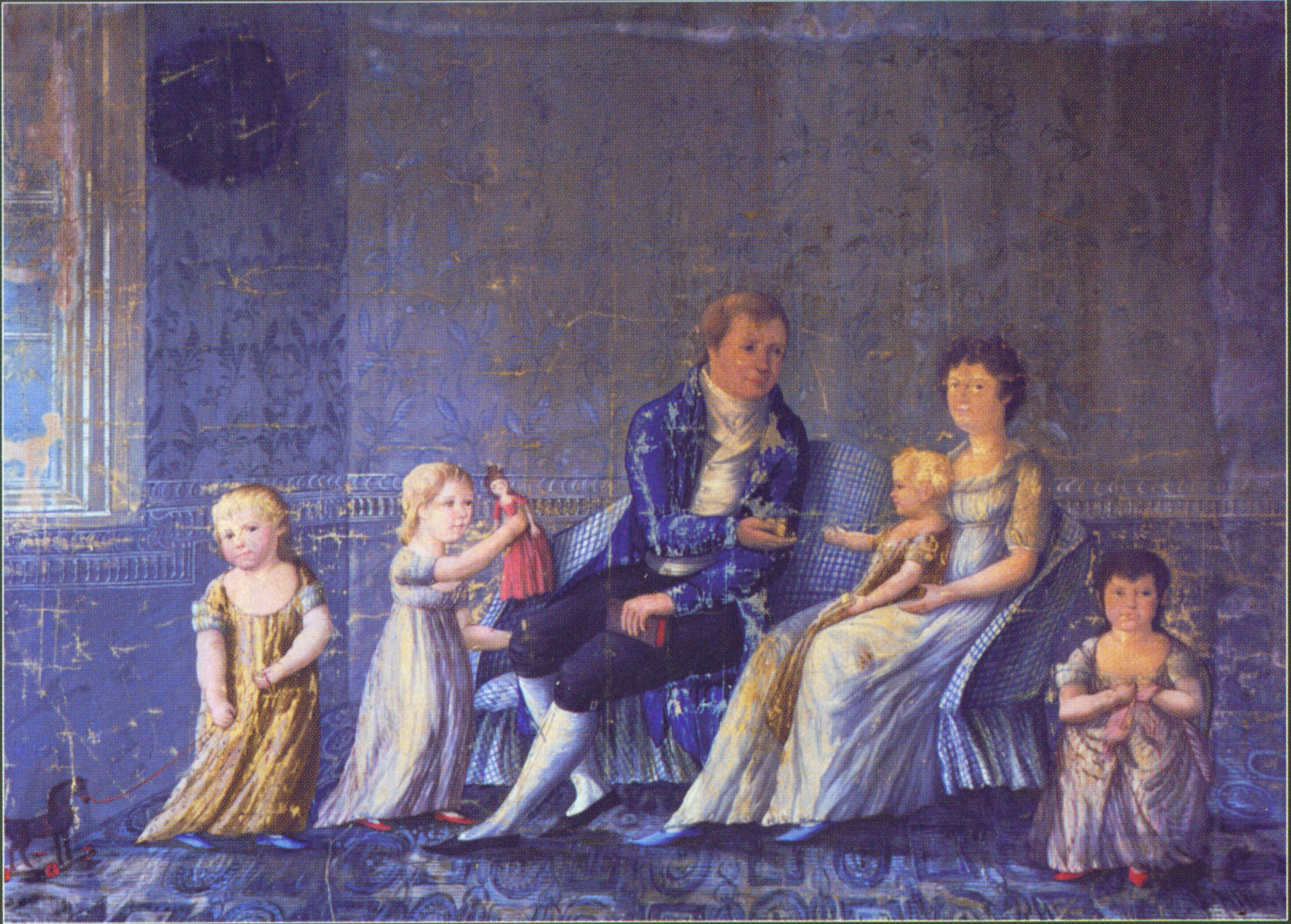
Portrait of Elias Hasket Derby Jr. and his family

Elias and Elizabeth Derby had a son, Elias Hasket Derby Jr. He followed his father into shipping and trade. He also married and had a family.

The eldest daughter of Derby and his wife, Elizabeth, married (eloped with) Captain Nathaniel West of Salem. Their marriage ended unusually in an ugly, very public divorce in 1806 (West v. West). After being awarded a great sum of alimony, Elizabeth Derby West moved to Danvers. There she had inherited Oak Hill, a country seat from her father. (More than a century later the North Shore Mall was developed here.)

Another daughter, Anstiss Derby, married merchant Benjamin Pickman. Their son Hasket Derby Pickman, Harvard Class of 1815, died the same year he graduated from college.

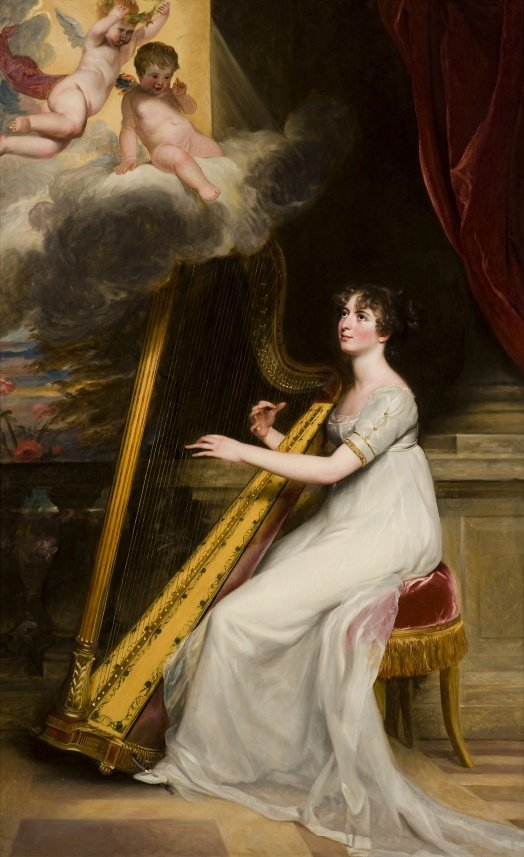
MRS. RICHARD CROWNINSHIELD DERBY as St Cecilia by John Singleton Copley in 1803.

Two sons were:

- Richard Crowninshield who married Martha Coffin
- John who married first Sarah Barton and then Eleanor Coffin [Elder sister of Martha Coffin]

== See also ==
- Derby Summer House
- List of richest Americans in history
- Salem Maritime National Historic Site
