= Azam Khan =

Azam Khan may refer to:

== Government and politics ==
- Azam Khan (Tughlaq dynasty), governor of Bengal 1324–1328
- Mir Muhammad Baqir, Subahdar (governor) of Bengal Subah 1632–1635
- Azam Khan Koka, Subahdar of Bengal Subah 1676–1677
- Mohammad Azam Khan, Emir of Afghanistan 1867–1868
- Amir Azam Khan (1912–1976), Pakistani politician and entrepreneur
- Mir Mohammad Azam Jan Khan, the Khan of Kalat from 1931 to 1933
- Azam Khan Hoti (1946–2015), Pakistani politician
- Azam Khan (politician) (born 1948), Indian politician
- Azam Khan Swati (born 1956), Pakistani politician and businessman
- Muhammad Azam Khan (civil servant) (active from 2018), Pakistani member of the Provincial Assembly of Khyber Pakhtunkhwa
- Azam Khan (civil servant), Pakistani civil servant

== Sports ==
- Azam Khan (cricketer, born 1969), Pakistani cricketer
- Azam Khan (cricketer, born 1998), Pakistani cricketer
- Azam Khan (squash player), Pakistani squash player

== Other ==
- Azam and Muazzam Khan, 15th-century Persian architect brothers of the Gujarat sultanate, tomb in Ahmedabad, India
- Azam Khan (general) (1908–1994), senior general of the Pakistan army
- Azam Khan (singer) (1950–2011), Bangladeshi pop singer
