= Khvoshinan-e Olya =

Khvoshinan-e Olya خوشينان عليا
- Village
- Location within Iran
- Coordinates: 34°32′18″N 46°53′01″E
- Country: Iran
- Province: Kermanshah
- County: Kermanshah
- Bakhsh: Central
- Rural District: Miyan Darband

Population (2006)
  - Total: 356
- Time zone: UTC+3:30 (IRST)
  - Summer (DST): UTC+4:30 (IRDT)

Khvoshinan-e Olya (Persian: خوشينان عليا, also Romanized as Khvoshīnān-e ‘Olyā, Khowshīnān-e ‘Olyā, and Khūshīnān-e ‘Olyā; also known as Bābā Khān, Khushinān Isfandīār, Khvoshīnān-e Bālā, and Khvoshīnān-e Esfandīār) is a village in Miyan Darband Rural District, in the Central District of Kermanshah County, Kermanshah Province, Iran. At the 2006 census, its population was 356, in 78 families.
