= Mohammad Zubair =

Mohammad Zubair may refer to:

- Muhammad Zubair Umar also known as Mohammad Zubair, Pakistani politician
- Mohammad Zubair Khan, Pakistani economist
- Mohammad Zubair (Pakistani cricketer), Rawalpindi cricketer
- Muhammad Zubair (field hockey), field hockey player
- Mohammed Zubair (journalist), Indian journalist and fact-checker
