= Azam Tariq =

Azam Tariq may refer to:

- Azam Tariq (religious leader) (1962–2003), founding member of Sipah-e-Sahaba Pakistan
- Azam Tariq (Tehrik-i-Taliban Pakistan) (died 2016), spokesperson of Tehrik-i-Taliban Pakistan
