= Khvoshinan-e Sofla =

Village in Kermanshah, Iran

Khvoshinan-e Sofla خوشينان سفلي
- Village
- Location within Iran
- Coordinates: 34°31′26″N 46°54′11″E
- Country: Iran
- Province: Kermanshah
- County: Kermanshah
- Bakhsh: Central
- Rural District: Miyan Darband

Population (2006)
  - Total: 176
- Time zone: UTC+3:30 (IRST)
  - Summer (DST): UTC+4:30 (IRDT)

Khvoshinan-e Sofla (Persian: خوشينان سفلي, also Romanized as Khvoshīnān-e Soflá and Khūshīnān-e Soflá; also known as Deh Kūr, Khoshnīān-e Soflá, Khushinān ‘Āzam, Khvoshī Nān-e A‘z̧am, and Khvoshīnān-e Deh Kūr) is a village in Miyan Darband Rural District, in the Central District of Kermanshah County, Kermanshah Province, Iran. At the 2006 census, its population was 176, in 40 families.
