= Azam and Muazzam Khan's Tomb =

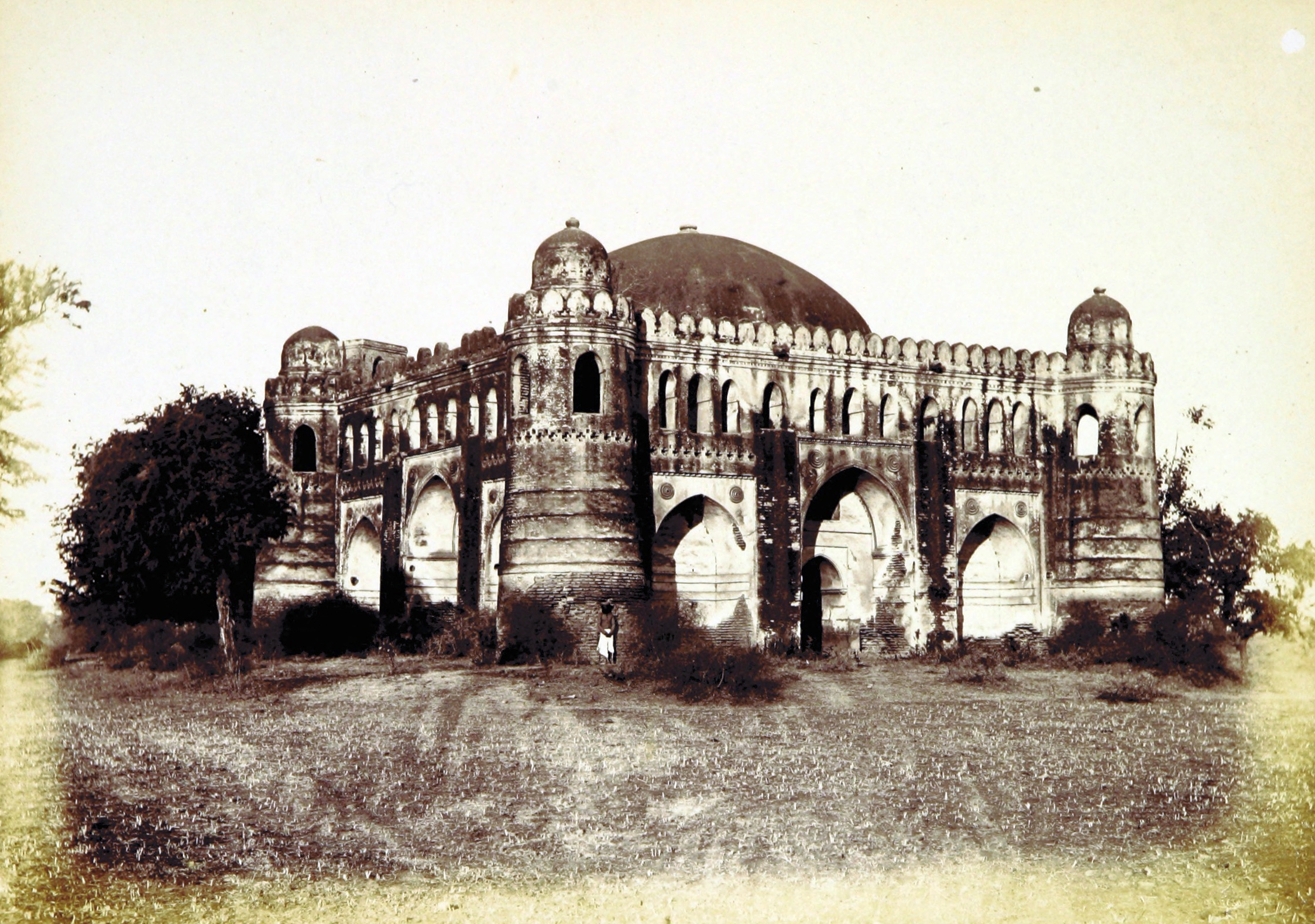
- Azam and Muazzam Khan's Tomb, 1866

- Location in Ahmedabad, Gujarat, India Azam and Muazzam Khan's Tomb (Gujarat)

Religion
- Affiliation: Islam
- Status: Active

Location
- Location: Ahmedabad
- Municipality: Ahmedabad Municipal Corporation
- State: Gujarat
- Coordinates: 23.0016918°N 72.5498827°E

Architecture
- Type: Tomb
- Style: Islamic architecture
- Completed: 1457
- Materials: Baked bricks
- Designated as NHL: Monument of National Importance; ASI Monument No. N-GJ-32

Azam and Muazzam Khan's Tomb or Azam Khan and Muazzam Khan's Roza is a medieval brick tomb in Vasna, Ahmedabad, India.

The roza was built over the graves of Persian brothers, Azam and Muazzam Khan, the archers and architects of Gujarat Sultanate era. They were credited as the architects of Sarkhej Roza. The roza was constructed in 1457 in solid bricks similar to Dariya Khan's Tomb. The garden and the mosque nearby no longer exist.
