= List of World Heritage Sites in India =

Location of World Heritage Sites in India:
- Green dots indicate the seven clusters in the Western Ghats
- Blue dots are the Hill Forts of Rajasthan
- Yellow dots are the Great Living Chola Temples
- Orange dots are the Sacred Ensembles of the Hoysalas
- Pink dots indicate the Mountain Railways of India
- Purple dots are the Maratha Military Landscapes of India
- Turquoise dots indicate cities with multiple sites. Delhi and Mumbai have three sites each, Agra and Jaipur have two sites each.

The United Nations Educational, Scientific and Cultural Organization (UNESCO) designates World Heritage Sites of outstanding universal value to cultural or natural heritage which have been nominated by countries which are signatories to the UNESCO World Heritage Convention, established in 1972. Cultural heritage consists of monuments (such as architectural works, monumental sculptures, or inscriptions), groups of buildings, and sites (including archaeological sites). Natural features (consisting of physical and biological formations), geological and physiographical formations (including habitats of threatened species of animals and plants), and natural sites which are important from the point of view of science, conservation or natural beauty, are defined as natural heritage. India accepted the convention on 14 November 1977, making its sites eligible for inclusion on the list.

There are 45 World Heritage Sites in India. Out of these, 37 are cultural, seven are natural, and one, Khangchendzonga National Park, is of mixed type, listed for both cultural and natural properties. India has the sixth-most sites worldwide. The first sites to be listed were the Ajanta Caves, Ellora Caves, Agra Fort, and Taj Mahal, all of which were inscribed in the 1983 session of the World Heritage Committee. The most recent site listed is the Ancient Buddhist Site of Sarnath, in 2026. At different times, two sites were listed as endangered: the Manas Wildlife Sanctuary was listed between 1992 and 2011 due to poaching and the activities of Bodo militias, and the monuments at Hampi were listed between 1999 and 2006 due to risks from increased traffic and new constructions in surroundings. One site is transnational: The Architectural Work of Le Corbusier is shared with six other countries. In addition, India has 81 sites on its tentative list.

== World Heritage sites ==
UNESCO lists sites under ten criteria; each entry must meet at least one of the criteria. Criteria i through vi are cultural, and vii through x are natural.

* Transnational site

Site	Image	Location (state)	Year listed	UNESCO data	Description
Ajanta Caves	Cave with carved columns and a shrine in the middle	Maharashtra	1983	242; i, ii, iii, vi (cultural)	The caves at Ajanta represent a collection of Buddhist art from two periods. The first monuments date to the 2nd and 1st centuries BCE and were created by the followers of Theravada Buddhism. Further monuments were added in the 5th and 6th centuries CE, during the Vakataka dynasty, by the followers of Mahayana Buddhism. The monuments are masterpieces of Buddhist art and exerted strong artistic influence in India and the broader region, especially in Java.
Ellora Caves	Tourists visiting a temple cut in rock	Maharashtra	1983	243; i, iii, vi (cultural)	The Ellora Caves comprise 34 temples and monasteries that were cut into a 2 km (1.2 mi) long basalt cliff between the 7th and 11th centuries during Rashtrakuta Empire. As they were built by followers of Buddhism, Hinduism, and Jainism, they illustrate the religious tolerance of the period when they were constructed. The largest temple is the Kailasa Temple (pictured), which is elaborately decorated with sculptures and paintings.
Agra Fort	Building in red stone with decorations	Uttar Pradesh	1983	251; iii (cultural)	Agra Fort is a 16th-century Mughal imperial fortress in Agra. It got its present layout under the Emperor Akbar. The complex contains several palaces (Jahangiri Mahal pictured), audience halls, and two mosques. Stylistically, it is one of the high points of Indo-Islamic architecture, with influences of Persian and Timurid architecture.
Taj Mahal	Taj Mahal, a domed building in white marble with four surrounding minarets	Uttar Pradesh	1983	252; i (cultural)	The Taj Mahal is considered the finest example of Indo-Islamic architecture. It was built in Agra on the bank of the Yamuna river as a mausoleum of Mumtaz Mahal, the Persian wife of the Mughal emperor Shah Jahan, between 1631 and 1648. It was designed by Ustad Ahmad Lahori and built in white marble inlaid with precious and semi-precious stones. The tomb is surrounded by four free-standing minarets. The complex also includes the main gate, a mosque, a guesthouse, and surrounding gardens.
Konark Sun Temple	A large Hindu temple in stone	Odisha	1984	246; i, iii, vi (cultural)	This Hindu temple was built by Narasingha Deva I of the Eastern Ganga dynasty in the 13th century and an example of Kalinga architecture. It represents the chariot of the solar deity Surya: on the outer sides, it has 24 richly decorated stone wheels, being pulled by seven horses. Other decorative motifs include lions, musicians, dancers, and erotic scenes.
Group of Monuments at Mahabalipuram	A Hindu temple in stone	Tamil Nadu	1984	249; i, ii, iii, vi (cultural)	The monuments around the town of Mamallapuram were built in the 7th and 8th centuries, under the Pallava dynasty. There are different types of monuments: the rathas, which are chariot-shaped temples (Dharmaraja Ratha); the mandapas (rock-cut temples); rock reliefs, including the giant Descent of the Ganges; Shore Temple (pictured) and other temples and archaeological remains. The artistic expression of the monuments was influential in the broader region, including Cambodia, Vietnam, and Java.
Kaziranga National Park	A rhino at a water edge	Assam	1985	337; ix, x (natural)	Kaziranga is located in the floodplains of the Brahmaputra River. It is one of the best wildlife sanctuaries in the world, home to the world's largest population of the Indian rhinoceros (pictured), as well as tigers, Asian elephants, wild water buffalo, and the Ganges river dolphin. The wetlands are important for migratory bird species.
Manas Wildlife Sanctuary	A herd of Wild elephants in the park	Assam	1985	338; vii, ix, x (natural)	The sanctuary along the Manas River covers grasslands on floodplains and forests, both in lowlands and in hills. The area is a biodiversity hotspot and home to several endangered species, including the Indian rhinoceros, Asian elephant (pictured), wild water buffalo, tiger, sloth bear, pygmy hog, Gee's golden langur, and Bengal florican. The forests are constantly being renewed after floods and changes in the river courses. Between 1992 and 2011, the site was listed as endangered due to poaching and the activities of Bodo militias.
Keoladeo National Park	A group of Bar Headed Geese and Demoiselle cranes flying together in the Sanctuary	Rajasthan	1985	340; x (natural)	Initially a duck-hunting reserve for Maharajas, Keoladeo is a man-made and man-maintained wetland. It is important both for migratory and resident birds, especially waterbirds. Over 350 species of birds have been recorded, including 15 species of herons, the Siberian crane, and the greater spotted eagle. The park is protected under the Ramsar Convention.
Churches and Convents of Goa	A church in red brick and an adjacent building in white	Goa	1986	234; ii, iv, vi (cultural)	Old Goa was the capital of Portuguese India, a colony that lasted for 450 years until 1961. The site comprises seven churches and convents that were built in the 16th and 17th centuries in the Gothic, Manueline, Mannerist, and Baroque styles, but which were also adapted to suit local techniques and resources. They spread architectural influences to Asian countries where Catholic missions were established. The Basilica of Bom Jesus, where Saint Francis Xavier is buried, is pictured.
Khajuraho Group of Monuments	Stone carvings representing people in different situations	Madhya Pradesh	1986	240; i, iii (cultural)	This site comprises 23 temples, both Hindu and Jain, that were built in the 10th and 11th centuries, during the Chandela dynasty. The temples are built in the Nagara style. They are richly decorated with stone carvings and sculptures that depict sacred and secular motifs, including depictions of domestic life, musicians, dancers, and amorous couples. A detail from the Lakshmana Temple is pictured.
Group of Monuments at Hampi	A stone chariot in Dravidian style in Hampi	Karnataka	1986	241bis; i, iii, iv (cultural)	Hampi was the capital of the Vijayanagara Empire until its abandonment after its sacking and pillaging by the Deccan sultanates in 1565. For about 200 years, it was a prosperous multi-cultural city that left several monuments in the Dravidian style as well as the Indo-Islamic style. The remains include religious and secular buildings and defensive structures. The Vitthala Temple is pictured. A minor boundary modification of the site took place in 2012. Between 1999 and 2006, the site was listed as endangered due to risks posed by increased traffic and new constructions.
Fatehpur Sikri	A large gate in red stone in Mughal style	Uttar Pradesh	1986	255; ii, iii, iv (cultural)	For about a decade in the second half of the 16th century, Fatehpur Sikri was the capital of the Mughal Empire under Emperor Akbar, until the capital was moved to Lahore in 1585 and the city was mostly abandoned. The site comprises a large collection of monuments and temples in the Mughal style, such as the Jama Masjid (the gate to the mosque, the Buland Darwaza, pictured), the Panch Mahal palace, and the Tomb of Salim Chishti.
Group of Monuments at Pattadakal	A Hindu temple in light-coloured stone	Karnataka	1987	239rev; iii, iv (cultural)	This site comprises nine Hindu temples and one Jain temple that were built in the 7th and 8th centuries under the Chalukya dynasty. They were constructed in the Badami Chalukya style that blends influences from northern and southern India. The Temple of Virupaksha is pictured.
Elephanta Caves	Stone carvings representing Shiva and religious scenes	Maharashtra	1987	244rev; i, iii (cultural)	The cave complex, located on Elephanta Island in Mumbai Harbour, was constructed mainly in the 5th and 6th centuries, with remains of human occupation dating back to the 2nd century BCE. The temples are dedicated to Shiva. The caves are decorated with stone carvings, some of them colossal. A statue of Trimurti Shiva, flanked by the dvarapalas, is pictured.
Great Living Chola Temples		Tamil Nadu	1987	250bis; i, ii, iii, iv (cultural)	This site comprises three Hindu temples built in the 11th and 12th centuries under the Chola dynasty. They represent some of the best examples of Dravidian architecture of the Chola period. They are made of stone and decorated with stone and bronze sculptures. Initially, only the Brihadisvara Temple (pictured) was listed as a World Heritage Site; two other temples, the Brihadisvara Temple and the Airavatesvara Temple were added in 2004, after which the site was renamed to its current name.
Sundarbans National Park	A tiger at the water margin	West Bengal	1987	452; ix, x (natural)	The national park covers the Indian part of the Sundarbans, the delta of the Ganges and Brahmaputra rivers. It is the world's largest and richest mangrove forest, with about 78 recorded mangrove species. It is a biodiversity hotspot, home to a large population of Bengal tigers (one pictured), as well as an important habitat for the Irrawaddy dolphin and Ganges river dolphin, several species of birds and sea turtles. In Bangladesh, the Sundarbans is listed as a separate World Heritage Site.
Nanda Devi and Valley of Flowers National Parks	Flowers in a mountain valley	Uttarakhand	1988	335bis; vii, x (natural)	This site comprises two areas in the West Himalayas, the Valley of Flowers National Park (pictured) and the Nanda Devi National Park. There are different types of high-altitude habitats, from high mountain peaks (Nanda Devi at 7,817 m (25,646 ft) is India's second-highest mountain) to alpine meadows. In addition to numerous mountain plant species, the area is home to the Asiatic black bear, snow leopard, brown bear, and bharal. Nanda Devi NP was originally listed alone in 1988; the Valley of Flowers NP was added in 2005.
Buddhist Monuments at Sanchi	A large stupa in stone with an elaborate gate in front	Madhya Pradesh	1989	524; i, ii, iii, iv, vi (cultural)	Sanchi is one of the oldest extant Buddhist sanctuaries and was instrumental in the spread of the religion through the Indian subcontinent. It became important under Emperor Ashoka of the Maurya Empire in the 3rd century BCE. The remains of a pillar from the period are preserved. Stupas (Stupa 1 pictured), palaces, temples, and monasteries are preserved in different states of conservation, mostly dating to the 2nd and 1st centuries BCE. The city declined in importance in the 12th century.
Humayun's Tomb	Look at a mausoleum in white and red stone through a gate	Delhi	1993	232bis; ii, iv (cultural)	The tomb of the Mughal emperor Humayun was constructed in the 1560s and represents the first example of a garden tomb on the Indian subcontinent, introducing the elements of Persian gardens. The monumental double-domed mausoleum represents a leap in Mughal architecture and is an architectural predecessor of the Taj Mahal. The complex includes several smaller tombs from the period. A minor boundary modification took place in 2016.
Qutb Minar complex	A tall minaret and a mausoleum, both in red and white stone	Delhi	1993	233; iv (cultural)	The complex comprises several early Islamic India monuments from the 13th and 14th centuries when the Delhi Sultanate established power there. They include the Qutb Minar, a 72.5 m (238 ft)-high minaret (pictured), the Alai Darwaza gateway, the Quwwat-ul-Islam Mosque where several stone pillars from previous Hindu temples were repurposed, the Iron pillar, and several tombs and other monuments.
Mountain Railways of India	A train crossing a bridge with several arches	West Bengal, Tamil Nadu, Himachal Pradesh	1999	944ter; ii, iv (cultural)	This site comprises three mountain railways built in the late 19th and early 20th centuries during British East India Company Rule in India to provide access to towns in the highlands. They represent a technology transfer in a colonial setting; the construction involved building bridges and tunnels to cross difficult terrains. The railways supported further human settlement of the areas they linked to and are still fully operational. The Darjeeling Himalayan Railway was initially listed alone in 1999. The Nilgiri Mountain Railway was added in 2005, and the Kalka–Shimla railway (pictured) in 2008.
Mahabodhi Temple Complex at Bodh Gaya	A large stone Buddhist temple	Bihar	2002	1056rev; i, ii, iii, iv, vi (cultural)	The Buddhist temple complex marks the site where Buddha is said to have attained enlightenment under the Bodhi Tree. The present temple dates to the 5th and 6th centuries CE (during the Gupta period) and was built upon a previous structure commissioned by Emperor Ashoka in the 3rd century BCE. The temple is 50 m (160 ft) high and made of brick. It had a substantial influence on the development of architecture in the following centuries. After centuries of abandonment and neglect, the temple was extensively restored in the 19th century.
Rock Shelters of Bhimbetka	Rock paintings depicting people and animals	Madhya Pradesh	2003	925; iii, v (cultural)	This site comprises five clusters of rock shelters in the foothills of the Vindhya Range. They contain rock paintings from the hunter-gatherer societies of the Mesolithic to the historical period. The nearby villages still maintain some cultural practices similar to those depicted in the paintings.
Chhatrapati Shivaji Terminus (formerly Victoria Terminus)	A large heavily decorated railway station building	Maharashtra	2004	945rev; ii, iv (cultural)	The historic terminal train station in Mumbai was built in the late 19th century. It was designed by Frederick William Stevens in the Victorian Gothic style, drawing influences from Italian Gothic architecture and combining them with influences from Indian traditional buildings. It symbolized the wealth of Mumbai as a major commercial port within the British Commonwealth.
Champaner-Pavagadh Archaeological Park	A mosque in brown stone	Gujarat	2004	1101; ii, iv, v, vi (cultural)	The site contains remains from several periods, from the Chalcolithic to the remains of Champaner, a short-lived capital of the Gujarat Sultanate in the 16th century. Important buildings include the Hindu temple Kalika Mata, Jain temples, and Jama Mosque (pictured) which features both Hindu and Muslim architectural elements, and the remains of water-managing systems, fortifications, and 14th-century temples.
Red Fort Complex	Fortress walls and a gate in red stone	Delhi	2007	231rev; ii, iii, vi (cultural)	The Red Fort was built under Mughal emperor Shah Jahan in the mid-17th century. It represents the zenith of Mughal architecture, blending the elements of Indo-Persian culture with Timurid elements. Its architecture had a strong influence on later palaces and gardens in the region. The Red Fort was also the setting of historical events; it was sacked and partially repurposed by the British, and it was the site where the independence of India was first celebrated. The Lahori Gate is pictured.
Jantar Mantar, Jaipur	A collection of buildings for astronomical purposes	Rajasthan	2010	1338; iii, vi (cultural)	The Jantar Mantar in Jaipur is India's most significant historic astronomical observatory. It dates from the early 18th century and was built by Rajput king Sawai Jai Singh. There are about 20 astronomical instruments that were designed and built for naked eye observations of the positions of stars and planets. It also served as a meeting point for different scientific cultures.
Western Ghats	A scenic view of Pampadumshola Mountains	Maharashtra, Karnataka, Kerala, Tamil Nadu	2012	1342rev; ix, x (natural)	The Western Ghats is a mountain range that runs along the western coast of the Indian subcontinent. It is covered with montane forests. The area is a biodiversity hotspot and home to endangered species such as the Bengal tiger, lion-tailed macaque, Nilgiri tahr, and Nilgiri langur. In terms of evolutionary history, the area is important given the breakup of Gondwana in the early Jurassic period, after which India was an isolated landmass until its collision with the Eurasian Plate. The World Heritage Site comprises 39 individual properties.
Hill Forts of Rajasthan	A fortress in light-coloured stone above a river	Rajasthan	2013	247rev; ii, iii (cultural)	This site comprises six forts: the Chittor Fort, Kumbhalgarh Fort, Ranthambore Fort, Gagron Fort, Amber Fort (pictured), and Jaisalmer Fort, which were constructed between the 8th and 18th centuries by Rajput kingdoms. They are eclectic in style, with elements of Sultanate and Mughal architecture, and were influential on the later styles of the Maratha Empire. They are situated in different settings; for example, Ranthambore is in a forest, and Jaisalmer is in a desert.
Rani-ki-Vav (the Queen's Stepwell) at Patan, Gujarat	A view of the stepwell with several decorated pillars	Gujarat	2014	922; i, iv (cultural)	Rani-ki-Vav is one of the finest examples of a stepwell, an elaborate type of well where groundwater is accessed through several levels of stairs. It was constructed in the 11th century, during the Chaulukya dynasty, on the banks of the Saraswati River in the city of Patan. It has seven levels, each decorated with stone carvings and sculptures depicting religious and secular themes and literary works. After the change in the river course in the 13th century, it was no longer in use and got covered with silt, which allowed for its preservation.
Great Himalayan National Park Conservation Area	Meadow with cattle grazing and snow-capped peaks in the background	Himachal Pradesh	2014	1406rev; x (natural)	The national park covers habitats from alpine peaks of the Himalayas above 6,000 m (20,000 ft) to alpine meadows and riverine forests below 2,000 m (6,600 ft). In total, there are 25 types of forests recorded, and they have rich floral and faunal assemblies, including numerous species of birds, mammals, reptiles, and insects. It is home to endangered species such as the western tragopan and musk deer.
Archaeological Site of Nalanda Mahavihara at Nalanda, Bihar	Ruins of brick buildings	Bihar	2016	1502; iv, vi (cultural)	Nalanda Mahavihara was a Buddhist ancient higher-learning institution established in the 5th century during Gupta Empire and lasting until its sacking in the 13th century. However, some archaeological remains also date back to the 3rd century BCE. The remains include shrines and stupas, viharas (residential and educational buildings), and artworks in different materials. Both the architectural solutions and educational approaches were influential in other similar institutions in the broader region.
Khangchendzonga National Park	Snow-covered mountains and a lake in front	Sikkim	2016	1513; iii, vi, vii, x (mixed)	The national park is located around Mount Khangchendzonga, the world's third highest mountain (8,586 m (28,169 ft)). It is a sacred mountain in Tibetan Buddhism, where the area is considered a beyul, a sacred hidden land. It is home to ethnically very diverse Sikkimese communities. From the natural perspective, the area comprises various habitats, from high mountains with glaciers to old-growth forests, and is rich in animal and plant species.
The Architectural Work of Le Corbusier, an Outstanding Contribution to the Modern Movement*	A modernist concrete building, a pond in front	Chandigarh	2016	1321rev; i, ii, vi (cultural)	This transnational site (shared with Argentina, Belgium, France, Germany, Switzerland, and Japan) encompasses 17 works of Franco-Swiss architect Le Corbusier. Le Corbusier was an important representative of the 20th-century Modernist movement, which introduced new architectural techniques to meet the needs of the changing society. The Chandigarh Capitol Complex is listed in India. It is the central part of the city of Chandigarh and is designed in line with the principles of a radiant city. The Palace of Assembly is pictured.
Historic City of Ahmadabad	An intricately carved Jali Design on Sidi Saiyyed Mosque	Gujarat	2017	1551; ii, v (cultural)	The city of Ahmedabad was founded by Ahmad Shah I in 1411 to serve as the capital of the Gujarat Sultanate. It was the meeting place of many religions (Hinduism, Islam, Buddhism, Jainism, Christianity, Zoroastrianism, and Judaism), which resulted in a unique urban fabric. The architecture is based on timber, and the typical neighborhoods are called pols, densely packed traditional houses with gated streets. Important buildings from the Sultanate period include the Bhadra Fort city walls, Teen Darwaza (Pictured), Rani Sipri's Mosque, Sidi Bashir Mosque, Sidi Saiyyed Mosque and Jama Mosque and other numerous mosques, tombs, and shrines.
Victorian Gothic and Art Deco Ensembles of Mumbai	A brick building in neo-gothic style	Maharashtra	2018	1480; ii, iv (cultural)	This site comprises two assemblies of buildings in Mumbai from the British Empire era. Public buildings in the Victorian Gothic style from the second half of the 19th century adapted Gothic Revival elements for the Indian climate, introducing features such as balconies and verandas. The Bombay High Court building is pictured. The Art Deco buildings date to the early 20th century and include cinema halls and apartment buildings. See also Art Deco in Mumbai.
Jaipur City, Rajasthan	A large palace in red and pink sandstone with many windows	Rajasthan	2019	1605; ii, iv, vi (cultural)	Jaipur was founded by the Rajput ruler Jai Singh II in 1727. The city was built with a grid plan, inspired by ancient Hindu and Western ideals, in a departure from the medieval architecture of the region. It was a strong trade centre and home to craftsmen and artists. Important buildings and sites include the Hawa Mahal palace (pictured), Govind Dev Ji Temple, City Palace, and Jantar Mantar, which is listed as a separate World Heritage Site.
Kakatiya Rudreshwara (Ramappa) Temple, Telangana	A Hindu temple in red stone	Telangana	2021	1570; i, iii (cultural)	The Hindu temple, dedicated to Shiva, was constructed in the first half of the 13th century under the Kakatiya dynasty. It is decorated with stone carvings and sculptures in granite and dolerite that depict regional dance customs. In line with Hindu practices, the temple is constructed in a way that blends harmonically with the environment.
Dholavira: a Harappan City	Archaeological site with some brick and stone walls	Gujarat	2021	1645; iii, iv (cultural)	Dholavira was one of the centres of the Harappan Civilisation from the 3rd to mid-2nd millennium BCE, in the Bronze Age. The remains include a walled city and a cemetery, and there are remains of buildings and water management systems. The city's location was chosen because of nearby sources of precious minerals. The city had trade connections with other cities in the region and as far as Mesopotamia. The site was rediscovered in 1968.
Santiniketan	A building with elaborate facade behind a metal fence	West Bengal	2023	1375; iv, vi (cultural)	Santiniketan was founded as an ashram by Debendranath Tagore in the second half of the 19th century and then developed into a university town for Visva-Bharati University. It is connected to the life and philosophy of Debendranath's son Rabindranath Tagore, the leading figure of the Bengali Renaissance. The prayer hall is pictured.
Sacred Ensembles of the Hoysalas	Hindu temple in Dravidian style	Karnataka	2023	1670; i, ii, iv (cultural)	Three Hoysala temples - the Chennakeshava Temple in Belur, the Hoysaleswara Temple in Halebidu and the Keshava temple (pictured) in Somanathapura, dating between the 12th and 14th centuries. Hoysala architecture combined the elements of Dravidian architecture with influences from northern India. The temples were built by the followers of Vaishnavism and Shaivism and they are richly decorated with stone sculptures and carvings. The Chennakeshava Temple in Belur is still an important pilgrimage site.
Moidams – the Mound-Burial system of the Ahom Dynasty	A tumulus in a forest	Assam	2024	1711; iii, iv (cultural)	Charaideo was the capital of the Ahom kingdom (1228–1826), and the tumuli were the burial sites of the royals and nobility. The tumuli create an undulating landscape reminiscent of hills, in line with the spiritual beliefs of the Tai-Ahom people.
Maratha Military Landscapes of India	Two fortress towers, partially in ruin	Maharashtra, Tamil Nadu	2025	1739; iv, vi (cultural)	This inscription comprises eleven forts in Maharashtra and one in Tamil Nadu. They are typically constructed of basalt rocks on the hills and were used for defensive purposes in different historical periods. The forts are connected to the Maratha ruler Chhatrapati Shivaji, who commissioned several of them in the 17th century. The Raigad Fort is pictured.
Ancient Buddhist Site of Sarnath	A brick Buddhist stupa	Uttar Pradesh	2026	927; iii, vi (cultural)	This comprises two groups of monuments. The first group includes Buddhist temples, stupas (Dhamek Stupa pictured), and monasteries, as well as the remains of a pillar of Ashoka. They date from the 3rd century BCE to the 12th century CE. The second group is represented by the Chaukhandi Stupa, built in 1588.

== Tentative list ==
In addition to sites inscribed on the World Heritage List, member states can maintain a list of tentative sites that they may consider for nomination. Nominations for the World Heritage List are only accepted if the site was previously listed on the tentative list. India lists 81 properties on its tentative list.

* Transnational site

Site	Image	Location (state)	Year listed	UNESCO criteria	Description
Temples at Bishnupur, West Bengal	A brick temple with a domed roof	West Bengal	1998	(cultural)	The terracotta temples built by Malla kings of Bishnupur date to the 17th century. They were built in brick and laterite stone. They have characteristic sloping roofs. The Jor Bangla Temple, from 1655, is pictured.
Mattancherry Palace, Ernakulam, Kerala	A building with cars parked in front	Kerala	1998	(cultural)	The palace was built by the Portuguese for the local rulers around 1555. It is a two-storey building with several halls and a ceiling decorated with carvings in the coronation hall.
Group of Monuments at Mandu, Madhya Pradesh	A building in Indo-Islamic style above a pond	Madhya Pradesh	1998	(cultural)	This nomination comprises monuments dating from the 11th to the 16th centuries. They include rock-cut tombs and temples, mosques, palaces, and pavilions. The Jahaz Mahal palace is pictured.
Sri Harimandir Sahib, Amritsar, Punjab	A temple in golden colour with a pool in front	Punjab	2004	iii, iv, vi (cultural)	Sri Harimandir Sahib, also known as the Golden Temple, is the spiritual centre of Sikhism. The temple complex was rebuilt several times. The architectural layout of the complex reflects the spiritual concepts of the religion. The main temple building is richly decorated with floral patterns, either painted or as marble inlay.
River Island of Majuli in midstream of Brahmaputra River in Assam	Two men on a boat on a river	Assam	2004	ii, iii, v, vi (cultural)	Majuli is a large river island in the Brahmaputra River. There are over 200 villages on the island, inhabited by people from various ethnic origins. A characteristic concept of the region is the satras, institutional centres for cultural activities that also serve as democratic mediators for dispute resolution.
Namdapha National Park	Forest and snow-covered mountains in the background	Arunachal Pradesh	2006	vii, ix, x (natural)	The national park covers an extensive wilderness area mostly covered in forests and sparsely explored. It is located in the Eastern Himalayas. The highest peak is Dapha Bum, at 4,571 m (14,997 ft).
Wild Ass Sanctuary, Little Rann of Kutch	Two wild asses	Gujarat	2006	x (natural)	Little Rann of Kutch is a salt marsh with sparse vegetation, mostly with xerophytic species. It is home to the last wild population of the Indian wild ass (pictured). It is also an important nesting area for birds.
Neora Valley National Park	Forest scenery	West Bengal	2009	vii, x (natural)	The area is covered by virgin forest and is a biodiversity hotspot. The valley spans from lowlands to altitudes around 3,200 m (10,500 ft), which results in a variety of habitats. It is home to several bird species and mammals, including the red panda and two species of pangolin.
Desert National Park	Sand dunes and some shrubs	Rajasthan	2009	vii, viii, x (natural)	The national park covers a part of the Thar Desert. It is home to several endemic species such as the Indian hairy-footed gerbil and the Rajasthan toad-headed lizard. It is also home to two endangered species of vultures. The Chinkara gazelle (Gazella bennettii) is a common antelope of this region. There are fossil beds in the park, dating to the Jurassic period.
Silk Road Sites in India	Archaeological remains of a stupa	Bihar, Jammu and Kashmir, Maharashtra, Puducherry, Punjab, Tamil Nadu, Uttar Pradesh	2010	ii, iii, vi (cultural)	This nomination comprises 12 sites connected to the ancient Silk Road, a network of trade routes connecting Eurasia. There were at least three corridors in India. In addition to the movement of goods, they were important in the spread of Buddhism and Greco-Buddhist culture. Sites in the nomination include the Roman trade port at Arikamedu, Vikramashila (pictured) and the early Buddhist site of Vaishali (the Relic Stupa).
The Qutb Shahi Monuments of Hyderabad Golconda Fort, Qutb Shahi Tombs, Charminar	Charminar at Hyderabad	Telangana	2010	i, ii, iii, iv (cultural)	This nomination comprises the monuments of the Qutb Shahi dynasty, a sultanate that ruled in the 16th and 17th century, in Hyderabad and its surroundings. The Golconda Fort is a citadel and early capital. Qutb Shahi tombs (two pictured) are mosques and burial places of the sultans, and Charminar, built in 1591, is a monumental gateway with four minarets. These sites illustrate the cosmopolitan nature of the region in that period.
Mughal Gardens in Kashmir	A pavilion in the middle of a pond	Jammu and Kashmir	2010	i, ii, iv (cultural)	Mughal gardens were built in a style influenced by Persian gardens, particularly by the Charbagh layout, with terraces and fountains arranged around a central water channel, reflecting the Islamic concept of paradise. Six gardens are listed in the nomination: Chashme Shahi, Shalimar Bagh (pavilion pictured), Pari Mahal, Verinag, Achabal Gardens, and Nishat Bagh.
Delhi - A Heritage City	Two Islamic tombs with white domes and several people around	Delhi	2012	ii, v, vi (cultural)	Delhi, as Lal Kot, was founded in 1060 as a capital of the Tomara dynasty. Later, rulers built subsequent cities on the site. Delhi was the capital of the Delhi Sultanate and an intermittent capital of the Mughal Empire. During the British rule, the capital was moved from Calcutta to the newly constructed New Delhi in 1911. The nomination lists the following areas of historical and architectural importance: Mehrauli, Nizamuddin Dargah (the tomb of the Sufi saint Nizamuddin Auliya), Shahjahanabad (pictured), and New Delhi. Today Delhi, or the National Capital Territory (NCT) of Delhi, is part of the urban region of the National Capital Region of India.
Monuments and Forts of the Deccan Sultanate	Fortress gate in red brick	Karnataka, Telangana	2014	ii, iii (cultural)	This nomination comprises the monuments of Deccan sultanates, dating between the 14th and 17th centuries, in four cities: Gulbarga, Bidar, Bijapur in Karnataka state, and Hyderabad in Telangana state. The architecture of the Deccan sultanates represents interactions between Islamic and Hindu influences. Some of the monuments in the nomination include the Bidar Fort (pictured), Jama Mosque in Gulbarga, and the Qutb Shahi tombs.
Cellular Jail, Andaman Islands	One of the jail wings with three rows of cells	Andaman and Nicobar Islands	2014	iv, vi (cultural)	The jail was constructed in 1906 by the British, primarily to exile political prisoners to the remote archipelago. The architecture was based on the panopticon system, with radiating wings that were easy to monitor by a single guard. Jail cells were intended for individuals for confinement. The jail was infamous for the brutal treatment of inmates and is important in the history of the Indian independence movement.
Iconic Saree Weaving Clusters of India	Picture of different types of saris	Madhya Pradesh, Uttar Pradesh, Maharashtra, Andhra Pradesh, Assam	2014	iii, v (cultural)	Sari, or saree, is a traditional attire of Indian women. Sari weaving required particular adjustments of the weavers' houses to accommodate looms and other devices for silk processing, resulting in a specific vernacular architecture. This nomination comprises eight clusters where sari weaving was and still is a major profession of the villagers. Different styles of saris are pictured.
Apatani Cultural Landscape	A hill covered with forest, a village and rice paddies	Arunachal Pradesh	2014	iii, v (cultural)	Apatani people live in the Ziro Valley that is surrounded by high mountains of the Himalayas. They have a culture that is distinct from that of other tribes in the region, with traditional crafts and festivals. They practice wet rice cultivation and are careful in land management, which allowed sustainable agriculture for several centuries. The resulting cultural landscape reflects the ability of the tribe to make the adverse environment habitable.
Sri Ranganathaswamy Temple, Srirangam	Two gopuram of a temple, decorated with figures	Tamil Nadu	2014	i, ii, iii, v (cultural)	The Sri Ranganathaswamy Temple is dedicated to Ranganatha. It is the world's largest operating Hindu temple and is, in fact, a temple town, with inner enclosures constituting the temple and outer ones being used for settlements. There have been temples at the site for over two millennia; however, the key buildings standing today date to the time of the Vijayanagara Empire, from the 14th to the 16th century. The temple has 21 gopurams, which are richly decorated with paintings and sculptures.
Monuments of Srirangapatna Island Town	Ranganathaswamy temple, Srirangapatna	Karnataka	2014	i, ii, iii, iv (cultural)	Srirangapatna, the river island in the Kaveri river, is an important pilgrimage site in South India. It has been continuously inhabited since the 12th century. The monuments on the island date to different historical periods, including the periods of the Hoysala Empire, Vijayanagara Empire, Kingdom of Mysore, and the British Raj. Most monuments date from the 16th to the 19th centuries and have elements of Hindu, Indo-Islamic, and British styles. The Ranganathaswamy Temple is pictured.
Chilika Lake	A group of Flamingos flying over Chilika Lake	Odisha	2014	ix, x (natural)	Chilika Lake is a large brackish water lagoon, fed by over 50 rivers and streams. It is an ephemeral environment, with the river sediments being deposited to the Bay of Bengal. Different parts of the lake are freshwater, brackish, and marine ecosystems and are an important habitat for birds and mammals, including the endangered Irrawaddy dolphin. The lake is rich in fish species that support the local fishermen population.
Padmanabhapuram Palace	A large building with white walls, red roof, and wooden beams	Tamil Nadu	2014	iii, iv (cultural)	The palace in Padmanabhapuram was constructed in the 16th century, with later additions continuing into the early 19th century, to serve as the seat of the Travancore royal family. It is a masterpiece of traditional timber architecture decorated with murals and carvings. Murals depict Hindu mythology and secular themes.
Sites of Satyagrah, India's non-violent freedom movement	People in front of an ashram building	several sites	2014	iv, vi (cultural)	Satyagraha, a form of nonviolent resistance or civil resistance, was developed by Mahatma Gandhi in the first half of the 20th century, as a part of the Indian independence movement. The nomination comprises 22 sites across India related to the movement. Several sites are ashrams (Sabarmati Ashram pictured), founded by Gandhi to teach his philosophy. Other sites are related to the independence movement. Satyagraha theory was influential in the civil rights movement in the United States and in the fight against apartheid in South Africa.
Thembang Fortified Village	Stone gate to the village	Arunachal Pradesh	2014	ii, iii, v (cultural)	The village of Thembang is located in the Eastern Himalayas at an altitude above 2,000 m (6,600 ft). It is built as a dzong, a type of fortified monastery also found in neighbouring Bhutan and Tibet. It is inhabited by the Monpas and was constructed before the 12th century.
Narcondam Island	A bird, hornbill, sitting on a tree branch	Andaman and Nicobar Islands	2014	viii, ix, x (natural)	Narcondam Island is a volcanic island off the main chain of the Andaman Islands. It is composed mostly of andesite, dacite, and amphibole, types of volcanic rocks and minerals. The island provides an important example of evolutionary processes due to its isolation. It is the only place where the endangered Narcondam hornbill (pictured) is found, and it is also home to several endemic species of the Andaman Islands.
Ekamra Kshetra – The Temple City, Bhubaneswar	A Hindu temple in stone	Odisha	2014	i, ii, iii (cultural)	Ekamra Kshetra is the name of the old part of the city of Bhubaneswar. It is a holy city and has earned the nickname "Temple City" due to about 700 temples that once stood here. The temples were built between the 3rd century BCE and 15th century CE. They are built in the Kalinga style, and belong to Hindu, Buddhist, and Jain religions. The Lingaraja Temple is pictured. In addition to the temples, there are also Udayagiri and Khandagiri Caves built by Jain worshipers.
The Neolithic Settlement of Burzahom	A clay pot with an animal with horns painted	Jammu and Kashmir	2014	ii, iii, v (cultural)	The archaeological site at Burzahom has provided information about different stages of societal development from the 4th to the 2nd millennium BCE. People initially lived in pit-houses and later built houses of mud and brick. There are also remains of megalithic structures. Material remains excavated at the site hint at interactions with cultures of Central and South West Asia. A painted pot from 2700 BCE is pictured.
Archaeological remains of a Harappa Port-Town, Lothal	Archaeological site with remains of drainage channels	Gujarat	2014	v (cultural)	Lothal was the only port-town of the Indus Valley civilisation, or Harappan Civilization, from the Bronze Age. It was occupied from around 2400 BCE to 1600 BCE when it was likely damaged by tidal flooding. The settlement consisted of a citadel with wide streets, a warehouse, and a port area along the river. Remains found at the site demonstrate trade links with the Persian Gulf region. The remains of drainage channels are pictured.
Mountain Railways of India (Extension)	Train on a hilly railway	Maharashtra, Himachal Pradesh	2014	ii, iv (cultural)	This is a proposed extension of the existing World Heritage Site. It includes the Matheran Hill Railway and the Kangra Valley Railway (pictured). They were built in the early 20th century; construction involved technical innovation to overcome difficult mountainous terrain.
Chettinad, Village Clusters of the Tamil Merchants	A large two-storey building with white decorated facade	Tamil Nadu	2014	ii, v, vi (cultural)	This nomination comprises 11 villages in three clusters. Wealthy merchants built them in the second half of the 19th and early 20th centuries. The villages mix urban and rural influences, both Tamil and those from a broader region, as a result of the travels of the merchants in Southeast Asia. Thousands of palatial houses were built using local and imported materials. The most recent ones, built in the 1930s and 1940s, are in the Art Deco style. An example of a palatial house is pictured.
Bahá'í House of Worship at Delhi	A temple in the shape of a lotus flower	Delhi	2014	i, v, vi (cultural)	The Lotus Temple is the main Baháʼí House of Worship in India. It was inaugurated in 1986. It has the shape of a lotus flower, with petals made of concrete and covered by marble.
Evolution of Temple Architecture – Aihole-Badami-Pattadakal	A Hindu temple in red stone	Karnataka	2015	iii, iv (cultural)	This nomination comprises several temples in Aihole, Badami, and Pattadakal, that were built between the 6th and 8th centuries under the Chalukya dynasty. They demonstrated the evolution of Hindu temple architecture with rock-cut and free-standing temples and were influential in temples built in later periods. The temples at Pattadakal are already listed as a World Heritage Site. The Durga Temple in Aihole is pictured.
Cold Desert Cultural Landscape of India	A monastery in a mountain valley covered by snow	Ladakh, Himachal Pradesh	2015	iii, v, vi, x (mixed)	The landscapes in the Himalayas are characterized by high altitudes, between 3,000 m (9,800 ft) and 5,000 m (16,000 ft), and harsh dry weather and temperatures ranging from above 30 °C (86 °F) in summer to below −30 °C (−22 °F) in winter. Two areas are inhabited, the Ladakh and the Spiti Valley. The culture is a mixture of Indian and Tibetan cultures. Several settlements are linked to Buddhist monasteries (Key Monastery pictured). From the natural perspective, the area is home to endangered species such as the snow leopard, Tibetan antelope, and the Himalayan wolf.
Sites along the Uttarapath, Badshahi Sadak, Sadak-e-Azam, Grand Trunk Road	A stone pillar close to a road	several sites	2015	ii, iv, vi (cultural)	The Grand Trunk Road is one of Asia's oldest and longest roads. It connects Afghanistan, Pakistan, India, and Bangladesh. The road has been used at least since the times of the Maurya Empire in the 4th century BCE, has been reconstructed several times in different periods, and has been upgraded to modern traffic in the 20th century. In addition to trade, the road has been instrumental in the spread of ideas, religions, and culture. Several historical sites have been preserved along the road. The Kos Minar, a milestone, in Ambala is pictured.
Keibul Lamjao Conservation Area	Lake with some floating plants	Manipur	2016	v, vii, ix, x (mixed)	Loktak Lake is a large freshwater lake that features a unique type of ecosystem called phumdi, floating islands consisting of soil and vegetation. The area is a mixture of aquatic, wetland, and terrestrial habitats, and is home to sangai, an endangered deer species. There are several villages on the shores of the lake, as well as some settlements on the phumdis.
Garo Hills Conservation Area (GHCA)	Lush green Scenery of western Garo Hills	Meghalaya	2018	v, vi, viii, x (mixed)	Garo Hills (Pictured) are inhabited by the Garo people, a tribe that speaks a language from the Tibeto-Burman family. They practice slash-and-burn agriculture regulated by community rules to ensure sustainable land use. The area is interesting from a geological perspective, with the terrain being shaped by the India–Asia collision system. The area is home to Asian elephant, gaur, clouded leopard, sambar deer, and five species of civet.
The historic ensemble of Orchha	A palace overlooking a forest and a river	Madhya Pradesh	2019	ii, iv (cultural)	The town of Orchha was founded in the 16th century by the Bundela clan to serve as their capital. In the following century, it came under Mughal influence. The architecture of the fort complex, palaces, temples, and gardens represent a mixture of styles from Rajput and Mughal architecture. The Jahangir Mahal is pictured.
Iconic Riverfront of the Historic City of Varanasi	Ganges riverfront with steps, temples, people, and boats	Uttar Pradesh	2021	iii, iv, vi (cultural)	Varanasi is a holy city of Hinduism, Buddhism, and Jainism. More than 80 ghats (steps to the river bank) are located along the Ganges, the holy river, and serve as a place for rituals and festivals. Varanasi has been continuously inhabited since at least 1200 BCE, while the earliest stone ghats date to the 14th century. Palatial buildings, temples, ashrams, and rest houses for pilgrims date to the 18th and later centuries. The Ahilya Ghat is pictured.
Temples of Kanchipuram	A Hindu temple in Tamil style	Tamil Nadu	2021	iv, vi (cultural)	Kanchipuram was the capital of the Pallava dynasty from the 6th to the 9th century. It is a holy Hindu city which used to have hundreds of temples. The architecture marks the shift from rock-cut temples to free-standing structures. 11 temples are listed in the nomination. The Ekambareswarar Temple is pictured.
Hire Benakal, Megalithic Site	Several prehistoric dolmens	Karnataka	2021	iii, iv (cultural)	Hire Benakal is the largest megalithic site in India. The dolmens date to the 1st millennium BCE to the Iron Age and provide information about the culture that constructed India's first large-scale monuments. Rock paintings have also been discovered on site. Depictions of human figures, riders, and animals date roughly from 700 to 500 BCE, while some paintings are older, from the Mesolithic.
Bhedaghat-Lametaghat in Narmada Valley	River flowing through a gorge with white marble stones	Madhya Pradesh	2021	vii, viii (natural)	At Bhedaghat, the Narmada River has carved a canyon through a mountain of white marble (pictured), creating a landscape that is both popular with tourists for its perceived beauty and of special interest for geologists. The Lameta Formation contains several fossils, including those of dinosaurs and crocodilians.
Satpura Tiger Reserve	A Bengal tiger in Satpura	Madhya Pradesh	2021	vii, ix, x (natural)	The forests in the Satpura Range hills are protected as a habitat for a large population of Bengal tiger (Pictured). The area acts as a faunal bridge between the Western Ghats and the Himalayas and is also home to several endangered plant species.
Konkan geoglyphs	Geoglyphs of Konkan Goa	Maharashtra, Goa	2022	i, iii, iv (cultural)	This nomination comprises 10 sites with geoglyphs in the Konkan coast. They date from the Mesolithic period, about ten millennia BCE to the second millennium BCE. They depict animals, human figures, and abstract art, and are related to the transition from hunter-gatherer societies to settled ones.
Jingkieng jri: Living Root Bridge Cultural Landscapes	Two bridges, consisting of tree roots, crossing a river	Meghalaya	2022	i, iii, vi (cultural)	A living root bridge is a type of simple suspension bridge formed of living plant roots by tree shaping. They are handmade from the aerial roots of rubber fig trees (Ficus elastica) over several generations and are common in the communities of the Khasi people. The bridges reflect a harmonious relationship between people and nature. An example of such a bridge in Nongriat village is pictured.
Sri Veerabhadra Temple and Monolithic Bull (Nandi), Lepakshi (The Vijayanagara Sculpture and Painting Art Tradition)	A Hindu temple in stone	Andhra Pradesh	2022	i, ii, vi (cultural)	The Hindu temple is located in the village of Lepakshi. The temple's construction started around 1100, while the major development took place during the period of the Vijayanagara Empire, from 1350 to 1600, when a large complex was built. The temple contains important examples of Vijayanagara art, including the only surviving frescoes from that period. A large monolithic bull (Nandi) is located on the temple grounds.
Sun Temple, Modhera and its adjoining monuments	A Hindu temple complex in stone	Gujarat	2022	i, iv (cultural)	The temple complex, a prominent example of the Māru-Gurjara style from the 11th century, is dedicated to the Sun God. It has three components: Gūḍhamanḍapa, the shrine hall; Sabhamanḍapa, the assembly hall; and Kunḍa, the reservoir.
Rock-cut Sculptures and Reliefs of the Unakoti, Unakoti Range, Unakoti District	Rock cut bas relief of Hindu deity	Tripura	2022	i, iv (cultural)	Unakoti features colossal rock cut panels and bas relief sculptures depicting Hindu deities, which date from the 8th and 9th centuries. They were created by the adherents of Shaivism, with the style influenced by local folk arts.
Vadnagar – A multi-layered Historic town, Gujarat	A torana gate in stone	Gujarat	2022	ii, v (cultural)	The town has been continuously occupied since 750 BCE, with monuments such as gates (Kirti Toran pictured), fortresses, and temples constructed throughout different historical periods. Remains found on site demonstrate the trade connections with the Indo-Greek Kingdom and the Roman Empire.
Serial nomination of Coastal Fortifications along the Konkan Coast, Maharashtra	An old fort with several towers, located at a coast	Maharashtra	2024	ii, iv, vi (cultural)	This nomination comprises nine forts in Maharashtra. They were used for trade and military functions between the 9th and 19th centuries. They supported trade routes connecting India with African and Arabian coasts and with the western countries. Vijaydurg Fort is pictured.
The Gond monuments of Ramnagar, Mandla	An old fortress made of stone, a wire fence in front	Madhya Pradesh	2024	ii, iii (cultural)	The nomination comprises clusters of monuments related to the kingdoms of the Gond people, including the Garha kingdom of the early modern era. The Gonds are the largest tribe in India and held a substantial rule over the central India before the rise of the Mughal Empire. The forts display an influence of the Mughal architecture and some influence from the Rajputs. The Moti Mahal, built under Hridayshah, is pictured.
The Bhojeshwar Mahadev Temple, Bhojpur	A large stone temple with some people around	Madhya Pradesh	2024	i, iii, iv (cultural)	Construction of the large temple started in the 11th century under the Paramara king Bhoja but was at some point abandoned so the temple is left unfinished. It demonstrates the architecture and arts of the period. Important features of the temple are a large lingam and architectural drawings carved on the walls, intended to assist the builders.
Rock Art Sites of the Chambal Valley	Rock art in red colour depicting human figures with weapons	Madhya Pradesh, Rajasthan	2024	iii, iv (cultural)	Chambal Valley has a large concentration of rock art. Sites date from the Paleolithic period with Acheulean stone tools, to rock art sites from the early historic times. Motifs and styles differ between periods. Some depict human figures, hunting and battle scenes, while art from the later periods has religious motifs.
Khooni Bhandara, Burhanpur	Underground tunnel for water management	Madhya Pradesh	2024	ii, iii, iv (cultural)	Khooni Bhandara is an underground water management system built under the Mughal Empire in the early 17th century in the city of Burhanpur. It is based on the Persian qanat system where the water flow is assisted only by gravity. The water system comprises pipelines and reservoirs. The capacity has been decreasing through time due to deposition of sediments on the walls.
Gwalior Fort, Madhya Pradesh	Fortress wall on a hill with several towers and elaborate decoration	Madhya Pradesh	2024	ii, iv (cultural)	The architecture of the fort predominantly shows a mixture of Rajput and Mughal styles but also includes earlier components, dating back to the 5th century. It features delicate stone carving elements. It served as a reference for later structures.
The historic ensemble of Dhamnar		Madhya Pradesh	2024	ii, iv (cultural)	The Dhamnar Caves are rock-cut caves dating back to between the 5th and 7th centuries CE. There are numerous Buddhist caves and a Hindu temple complex. Some of the caves include secluded and not ornamented spaces for monks (Vihāras).
Kanger Valley National Park		Chhattisgarh	2025	vii, viii, x (natural)	The national park covers the Kanger River valley. Its varying topography and the multitude of geological features contribute to the park's natural beauty and scientific importance. As an untouched forest area, it also contains diverse wildlife, including various threatened species.
Mudumal Megalithic Menhirs		Telangana	2025	v, vi (cultural)	The menhirs date back 3500–4000 years and are arranged to align with celestial events. They reflect the ancient cultures' understanding of celestial phenomena and have influenced local religious beliefs.
Serial nomination for Ashokan Edict sites along the Mauryan Routes		Andhra Pradesh, Bihar, Delhi, Gujarat, Karnataka, Madhya Pradesh, Uttar Pradesh	2025	iii, iv, v (cultural)	This nomination comprises thirty-five rock and pillar edicts, as well as cave inscriptions (segment of the Lauriya Araraj pillar pictured).
Serial nomination of Chausath Yogini Temples		Madhya Pradesh, Odisha, Tamil Nadu, Uttar Pradesh	2025	iii, iv (cultural)	This nomination comprises thirteen temples of yoginis (female yoga practitioners), each with 64 images or statues of yoginis (temple in Mitaoli pictured).
Serial nomination of Gupta Temples in North India		Bihar, Madhya Pradesh, Rajasthan, Uttar Pradesh	2025	i, iii (cultural)	This nomination comprises twenty temples of the Gupta dynasty (Dashavatara Temple in Deogarh pictured).
The Palace-Fortresses of the Bundelas		Madhya Pradesh and Uttar Pradesh	2025	ii, iv (cultural)	This nomination comprises six fortresses of the Bundelkhand region (Raja Mahal pictured).
Salkhan Fossil Park, Sonbhadra	Fossilized green algae with greenery in the background	Uttar Pradesh	2025	viii (natural)	This park features a large number of stromatolites and microfossils. It demonstrates the effect of the Great Oxidation Event on the development of unicellular life and how early microbes shaped the Earth's environment.
Naga Hill Ophiolite		Nagaland	2025	viii, ix (natural)	The Naga Hills are important in view of their geological structure. They containe ophiolites, sections of Earth's oceanic crust and the underlying upper mantle that have been uplifted and exposed on the continental plate. They provide insight into plate tectonics and continent collision. The area is also important due to its biodiversity, and is home to the vulnerable bird species rufous-necked hornbill.
Deccan Traps at Panchgani and Mahabaleshwar	View of rugged hills	Maharashtra	2025	viii, x (natural)	This nomination comprises parts of the Deccan Traps (Panchgani pictured) and the Koyna Wildlife Sanctuary. Deccan Traps are a large igneous province that was created in a geologically short volcanic episode around 66 million years ago. This resulted in lava deposits up to 2,000 m (6,600 ft) thick. The area is also a biodiversity hotspot, with animals including the Indian leopard, sloth bear, Nilgiri tahr, Indian giant squirrel, as well as numerous bird, reptile, and amphibian species.
Geological Heritage of St' Mary's Island Cluster	Basaltic rock formations on a shore	Karnataka	2025	viii (natural)	The four islands are significant because of their columnar basalt formations, originating from the Late Cretaceous epoch. They are associated with the volcanic activitsy during the breaking up between the Indian and the Madagascar plates.
Meghalayan Age Caves		Meghalaya	2025	vii, viii, ix (natural)	The four nominated caves feature numerous speleothems. The stalagmite sampled from the Mawmluh Cave was used to detect the chemical signatures related to the 4.2-kiloyear event, a prolongued drought linked to the collapse of several ancient civilizations. The cave is used as the Global Boundary Stratotype Section and Point for the Meghalayan age. Additionally, the caves are home to endemic species of fish and arthropods.
Natural Heritage of Erra Matti Dibbalu	Red sand formation with some plants	Andhra Pradesh	2025	viii (natural)	The sand, silt, and clay formations preserve the geologic record of the late Quaternary, including the fluctuations of the sea level during the glaciation episodes, monsoons, and dry seasons. The sediments were deposited by rivers or winds.
Natural Heritage of Tirumala Hills	A stone arch made of ancient rocks	Andhra Pradesh	2025	vii, viii, x (natural)	The area is significant due to the Eparchaean Unconformity, a rare geological stratigraphic formation where there is a gap of hundreds of million of years between the older Archean and younger Proterozoic rocks. One of the formations in the area is the Natural Arch (pictured), which is also sacred to the Hindus. The area is also home to diverse flora.
Natural Heritage of Varkala	A beach and a cliff in the background	Kerala	2025	vii, viii (natural)	This nomination comprises the cliff and the beach in Varkala. The cliff is a geological formation that shows different layers of sediments, documenting the processes such as tectonic uplift, sedimentation, and tropical weathering. There are numerous fossils found in the rocks. The area is also popular with visitors because of its scenic beauty.
Serial Nomination of Buddhist Triangle Sites of Odisha	Ruins and a collection of artefacts	Odisha	2025	ii, iv (cultural)	The nomination comprises three sites connected with Buddhism: Lalitagiri (ruins of a stupa pictured), Udayagiri, and Ratnagiri. They document the development of the religion from the 3rd or 2nd century BCE, with the transition from Theravada traditions into the Mahayana and Vajrayana schools. The sites also demonstrate the evolution of art and architectural styles.
Colonial Penal Settlement of Andaman Islands		Andaman and Nicobar Islands	2026	ii, iv, vi (cultural)	The colonial penal Settlement of the Andaman Islands was established by British in 1858 to imprison Indian freedom fighters and political prisoners. It includes Chatham Island, Ross Island, Viper Island and the famous Cellular Jail. These sites represent British colonial rule, the sacrifices of freedom fighters and India's struggle for Independence.
Nicobarese Cultural Continuity in the Central group of Nicobar Islands		Andaman and Nicobar Islands	2026	iii, v, vi (cultural)	
The Painted Haveli Towns of Shekhawati		Rajasthan	2026	iii, iv, v (cultural)	The painted Haveli Town, are famous for their magnificent merchant mansion decorated with colourful Fresco painting. Built mainly between the 18th and early 20th centuries, these havelis showcase beautiful artwork depicting mythology, historical events, daily life, animals and modern inventions. Their unique architecture, traditional water system and rich Marwari merchant make Shekhawati and extraordinary open-air art gallery. It reflects the culture and heritage of the Shekhawati region ( Sikar, Jhunjhunu and Churu ).
Rangpur-Sivasagar Historic Ensemble		Assam	2026	iii, iv (cultural)	Spread in Sivasagar district. This ensemble represents the architectural, cultural, and technological achievements of the Ahom dynasty, which ruled the Brahmaputra Valley for nearly 600 years. It includes magnificent palaces, temples, the Rang Ghar amphitheatre ( pictured ), Talatal Ghar, and large historic water reservoirs such as joysagar, Gaurisagar and Sivasagar.
Udaigiri Caves		Madhya Pradesh	2026	ii, iii, iv (cultural)	The Udaigiri Caves are rock cut caves located near Vidisha. Dating back to the 4th-5th Century CE, they were developing during the Gupta Period ( reign of Chandragupta II ). Caves are famous for their Hindu and Jain sculptures, inscriptions and religious significance. Most notable sculpture is Lord Vishnu in his Varaha incarnation, rescuing the Earth Goddess.
Group of Temples of the Chambal Valley: Bateshwar, Padavali and Kakarmath		Madhya Pradesh	2026	ii, iv (cultural)	This group represents the remarkable development of early mediaeval Indian temple architecture. Dating from the 8th and 11th centuries CE, these temples showcase the Nagar Style of architecture intricate stone carving and traditional dry-stone construction. Togather Bateshwar (in picture), Padavali and Kakarmath reflect the rich religious traditions, artistic excellence and architectural heritage of the Gurjara-Pratihara and Kachchhapaghata periods.
Ginnorgarh fort		Madhya Pradesh	2026	ii, iv (cultural)	Ginnorgarh fort located within the Ratapani Tiger Reserve. It served as an important political and administrative centre during Gond Kingdom. Fort is known for its impressive fortificate walls, Palace ruins and stepwells. Remains of the Seven-storey Rani Mahal ( in picture ) that show historical and architectural importance.
Bagh Cave paintings		Madhya Pradesh	2026	i, ii, iii, (cultural)	Paintings are dating back to 5th and 6th centuries CE. Executed on cave walls, these paintings illustrate Buddhist themes, human figures, and cultural activities, showcasing the artistic excellence and rich heritage of ancient India.
The Sites of Satyagraha: The Emergence and institutionalization of the non-violent movement (India)		Bihar; Gujarat; Maharashtra; Delhi	2026	iii, vi (cultural)	
Sirpur Cultural and Archaeological Landscape		Chhattisgarh	2026	ii, iv (cultural)	Bank of the Mahanadi river Village Sirpur located. It is an ancient Cultural, religious, and commercial centre that flourished between the 5th and 12th centuries CE. It is renowned for its Hindu temples, Buddhist monasteries, Jain monuments, and remarkable brick architecture, reflecting religious harmony, artistic exchange and the urban development of early mediaeval India.
Andaman Subduction Volcanoes		Andaman and Nicobar Islands	2026	vii, viii, ix, x (natural)	Andaman subduction Volcanoes are formed due to the subduction of Indian Plate beneath the Burma microplate.This tectonic process produce Magma, causing volcanic activity in the region. Barren Island, located in the Andaman Sea, is only India's confirm active volcano site.
Karst-mud-volcano Complex of Baratang		Andaman and Nicobar Islands	2026	viii, ix, x (natural)	Karst-mud-volcano Complex of Baratang is a unique geological landscape featuring limestone caves, karst formations and active mud Volcanoes.These geological features provide valuable evidence of the region's tectonic evolution, cave formation processes, and ecological diversity.

== See also ==
- List of Intangible Cultural Heritage elements in India
- List of inscriptions in UNESCO Memory of the World Register from India
- National Geological Monuments of India
- UNESCO world heritage site
- Monuments of National Importance of India
- List of rock-cut temples in India
- List of forts in India
- List of museums in India
- Tourism in India
