= List of inscriptions in UNESCO Memory of the World Register from India =

UNESCO's Memory of the World International Register includes 13 inscriptions from India. There are additional inscriptions from India in the regional Memory of the World Committee for Asia and the Pacific (MOWCAP) register. The latest additions are the Hindu text Mahabharata , Rajatarangini and Arthashastra in November 2026. In India, the Ministry of Culture oversees the task of promoting and preservation of arts and culture.

== Memory of the World inscriptions ==
+ Transnational element

=== Representative List ===
Name	Year inscribed	Document type	Description	Ref.
The Institute of Asian Studies Tamil Medical Manuscript Collection	1997	Books	It reflects the ancient system of medicines practiced by yogis during Dravidian empires.	
Archives of the Dutch East India Company	2003	Books	It is the complete archive of Dutch colonial rules in Asian and Africa. The inscription is shared by these countries, Netherlands; Indonesia; South Africa; Sri Lanka	
Shaiva manuscript in Puducherry	2005	Manuscripts	It is the largest collection in the world of manuscripts of texts of the Shaiva Siddhanta. The collection comprises thousands of palf-leaf codices predominantly in Sanskrit written in Grantha script.	
Rigveda	2007	Manuscripts	It is one of the four Vedas which dates back between c. 1500 and 1000 BCE; It is considered among the first literary documents in the history of humankind	
Tarikh e Khandan e Timuriyah	2011	Manuscripts	It describes the descendants of the 14th-century leader Timur.	
Laghukālacakratantrarājatikā (Vimalaprabha)	2011	Manuscripts	It is a commentary on the Kālacakratantra, the famous Tantra of the Buddhists which introduces the cult of Kalachakra into Buddhism. The text contain detailed discussions of astrology and astronomy.	
Shantinatha Charitra	2013	Papers	It describes the life and times of Shantinatha, the sixteenth Jain Tirthankara.	
Maitreyayvarakarana	2017	Books	It is a manuscript from Pala Period which is around Maitreya, the future incarnation of Buddha.	
Gilgit manuscripts	2017	Manuscripts	These are the oldest surviving manuscripts in Indian subcontinent which date back to 5-6th century CE.	
Abhinavagupta (940-1015 CE): Collection of Manuscripts of his works	2023	Manuscripts	It is the collection of many manuscripts written by Abhinavagupta on topics such as Shaivism, philosophy, Tantra etc and its history dates back to 10h century Kashmir	
First Summit Meeting of the Non-Aligned Movement Archives	2023	Books	These are textual files, photographs, and films documenting the 1961 Belgrade Summit, which marked the founding of the Non-Aligned Movement (NAM); The inscriptions are shared by following countries, Algeria; Egypt; Indonesia; Serbia	
Bhagwadgita	2025	Manuscripts	One of the Hindu holy books and a central text in the continuous, cumulative ancient intellectual Indian tradition, synthesizing various thought movements such as, Vedic, Buddhist, Jain and Cārvāka.	
Natyashastra	2025	Manuscripts	It embodies various set of rules for Natya, Abhinay, Raga, Bhava, Sangita etc like performing arts.	

== See also ==
- Memory of the World Register – Asia and the Pacific
- List of World Heritage Sites in India
- List of Intangible Cultural Heritage elements in India
