= List of Intangible Cultural Heritage elements in India =

UNESCO's list of intangible cultural heritage from India includes sixteen items (all are intangible cultural heritage). The latest cultural heritage included in the list is Deepavali(festival) added in 2025 and Garba, a tradition dance form from Gujarat. No examples from India were included in the "Intangible Cultural Heritage in Need of Urgent Protection" and "Register of Good Safeguarding Practices".

The inclusion of new heritage elements in UNESCO's lists of intangible cultural heritage is determined by the Intergovernmental Committee for the Safeguarding of Intangible Cultural Heritage established by the convention. In India, Ministry of Culture is charged with preservation, promotion and dissemination of culture of India.

India was added to the list for the first time in 2008 (at that time total three examples were added).

According to UNESCO, intangible cultural heritage includes holidays, festivals, performances, oral traditions, music and handicrafts were included in the list.

Nowruz or Navroz is the only object in the list which is shared by multiple countries. Navroz in India is celebrated mainly by Parsi community (Indian Zoroastrianian community).

== Intangible Cultural Heritage of Humanity ==
+ Transnational element

=== Representative List ===
Name	Image	Year listed	Type	Region/state	Description	No.
Kutiyattam, Sanskrit theatre		2008	Performing arts	Kerala	Koodiyattam or Kutiyattam is performed by Chakyar and Nangyaramma castes of Kerala. It is a performing art that dates back to Sangam era.	00010
Tradition of Vedic chanting		2008	Oral literature	Whole India	Vedic chanting is chanting of Sanskrit mantras or pathas. It is also a part of Sanskrit or Vedic study memorization.	00062
Ramlila, the traditional performance of the Ramayana		2008	Festival	Whole India (mainly North India)	It is a re-enactment of God Rama's life according to Ramayana.	00110
Ramman, religious festival and ritual theatre of the Garhwal Himalayas, India		2009	Festival	Salur Dungra, Uttarakhand	It is a festival of the Garhwali people of Salur Dungra village of Chamoli district. Not performed anywhere in the Himalayas.	00281
Chhau dance		2010	Performing arts	West Bengal, Jharkhand and Odisha	Purulia Chhau, Saraikela Chhau and Mayurbhanj Chhau are various styles of the dance.	00337
Kalbelia folk songs and dances of Rajasthan		2010	Performing arts	Rajasthan	Kalbeliya is a snake charming tribe. They perform dance on traditional music.	00340
Mudiyettu, ritual theatre and dance drama of Kerala		2010	Performing arts	Kerala	It is a dance drama that enacts stories and tales of a battle between Kali and Darika.	00345
Buddhist chanting of Ladakh: recitation of sacred Buddhist texts in the trans-Himalayan Ladakh region, Jammu and Kashmir, India		2012	Oral literature	Ladakh	It refers to the recitation of sacred Buddhist texts mainly performed by various sects such as Kagyud, Nyngma, Geluk, and Shakya.	00839
Sankirtana, ritual singing, drumming and dancing of Manipur		2013	Oral literature and performance	Manipur	It refers to narration of Vaishnava God Krishna's story through singing, drumming and dancing.	00843
Traditional brass and copper craft of utensil making among the Thatheras of Jandiala Guru, Punjab, India		2014	Handicrafts	Jandiala Guru, Punjab	Thateras are artisan cast of Punjab who makes brass and copper craft utensils.	00845
Navroz + (Note: Shared with Afghanistan, Azerbaijan, Iran, Iraq, Kazakhstan, Kyrgyzstan, Uzbekistan, Mongolia, Pakistan, Tajikistan, Turkmenistan, and Turkey.)		2016	Festival	Whole India	Navroz in India is mainly celebrated by Parsi community.	02097
Yoga		2016	Performance	Whole India	Yoga is physical and spiritual practice originated in Ancient India. Every year 21 June is celebrated as International Yoga Day.	01163
Kumbh Mela		2017	Festival	Cities of Haridwar, Prayagraj, Nashik-Trimbak and Ujjain	Kumbh Mela is held every 12 year on rotation.	01258
Durga Puja in Kolkata		2021	Festival	Kolkata, West Bengal	It is a festival of worshipping of Goddess Durga.	00703
Garba of Gujarat		2023	Festival	Gujarat	It is a form of dance and performed on festivals and occasions.	01962
Deepavali		2025	Festival	Whole of India	It is the festival of lights symbolising victory of light over darkness.	02312

== See also ==
- List of World Heritage Sites in India
- List of inscriptions in UNESCO Memory of the World Register from India
- UNESCO Intangible Cultural Heritage Lists
