= Mudumal Megalithic Menhirs =

- Mudumal Niluvu Raallu ముదుమల్ నిలువు రాళ్ళు
- Thimmappa of the Standing Stones
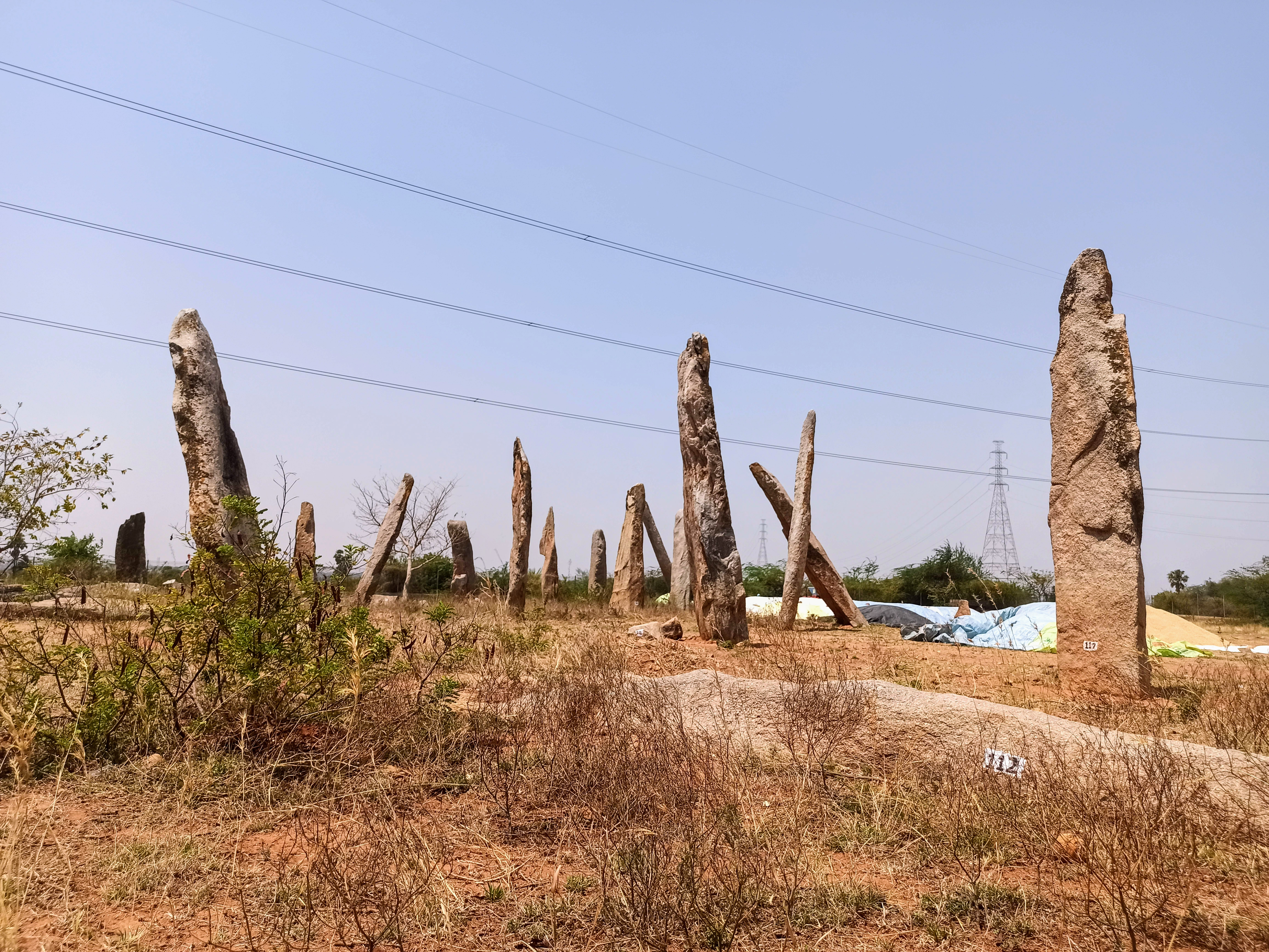
- view of the menhirs in 2025

- Location in Telangana Mudumal Megalithic Menhirs (India)
- 16°22′45″N 77°24′39″E
- Type: Menhir
- Location: Narayanpet district, Telangana, India

Site notes
- Material: Stone
- Area: 89 acres (36 ha)
- Owner: Government of Telangana

Mudumal Megalithic Menhirs are located at Narayanpet district of Telangana State in India.The menhirs date back 3500–4000 years and supposedly align with celestial events. They reflect the ancient cultures' understanding of celestial phenomena and is reported to have influenced local religious beliefs.

The site occupies 89 acres, and there are 80 stone structures. These structures are about 3 m (10 ft)-5 m (15 ft) tall and arranged in various formations such as circles, straight lines etc. Most of these formations were destroyed and boulders removed to facilitate irrigation of nearby agricultural lands.

The menhirs are also called as Niluralla Thimmappa i.e. Thimmappa of the Standing Stones by the locals according to whom these menhirs are sacred. One particular menhir is worshipped as Goddess Yellamma. Mudumal Megalithic Menhirs have been added to a tentative list of UNESCO World Heritage Sites from India. Other than this site, currently Telangana has only one UNESCO World Heritage Site at Ramappa temple.
