= Konkan geoglyphs =

Prehistoric Rock Art

The Konkan geoglyphs, sometimes called Konkan Petroglyphs, are a form of prehistoric rock art found along the Konkan coast of India, particularly in Maharashtra and Goa. They consist of carvings on laterite plateaus (saḍā) and are believed to date back 12,000 years

== Description ==
These carvings showcase animals like elephants, tigers, rhinoceroses, aquatic species like stingrays and turtles, and abstract human forms. They provide insights into the environment, fauna, and human settlements of the Mesolithic to early historic periods.

The sites span around 70 locations with over 1,500 carvings recorded. Prominent locations include Kasheli, Rundhye Tali, Devache Gothane, Barsu, Devi Hasol, Jambharun, Kudopi and Ukshi in Maharashtra, and Pansaymol in Goa. The geoglyphs’ artistic complexity and the absence of domesticated animals in the depictions suggest they were created by hunter-gatherer societies.

== Preservation Status ==
These geoglyphs are currently on India's tentative list for UNESCO World Heritage status. However, their preservation is threatened by developmental projects like a proposed refinery in Ratnagiri's Barsu area, which could damage the delicate carvings.

== See also ==
- Geoglyphs
- List of World Heritage Sites in India
