= Great Living Chola Temples =

UNESCO World Heritage Site
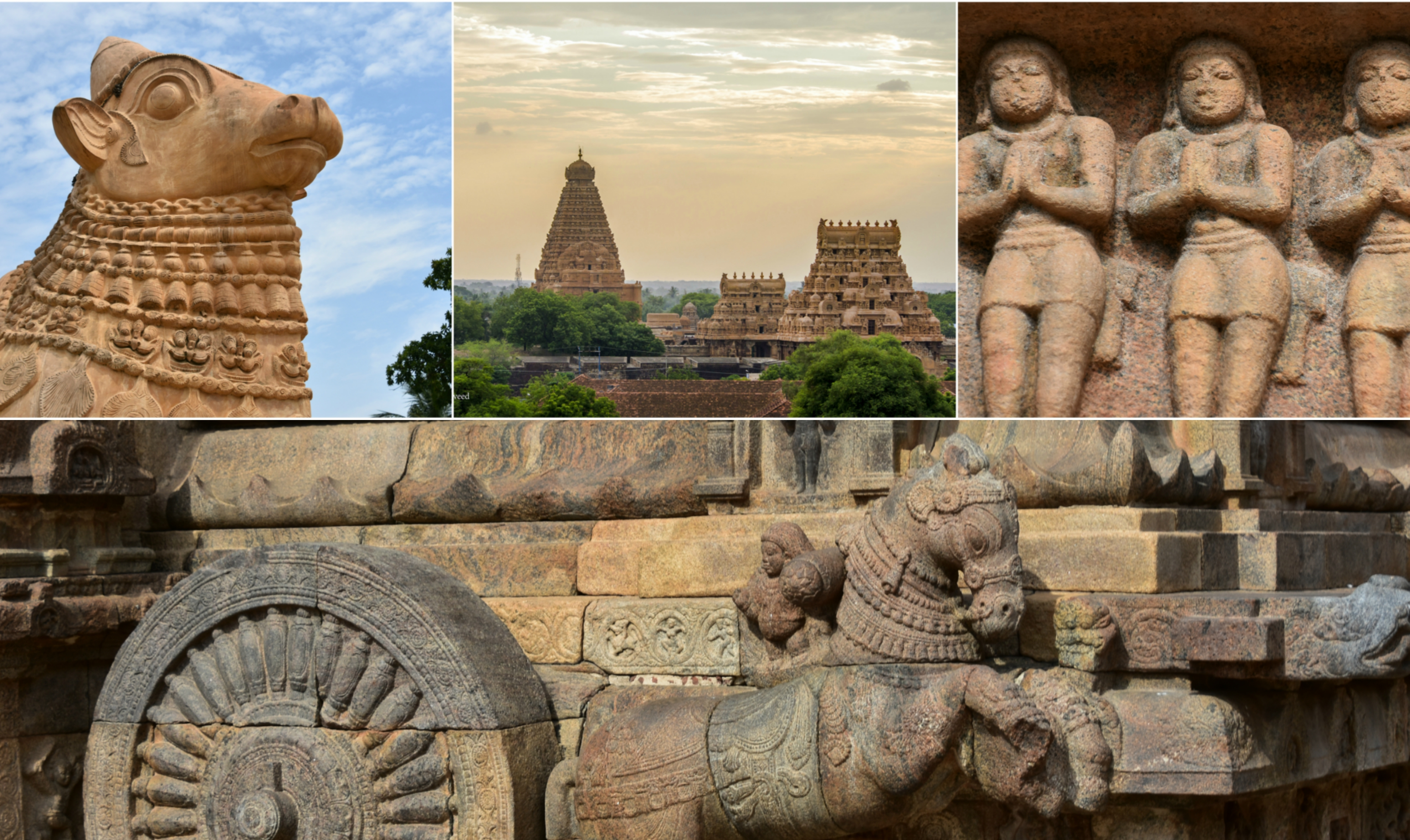
- Scenes from the three temples

- Location within India Location within Tamil Nadu
- Location: Tamil Nadu, India
- Includes: The Brihadisvara Temple Complex, Thanjavur; The Brihadisvara Temple Complex, Gangaikondacholapuram; The Airavatesvara Temple Complex, Darasuram
- Criteria: Cultural: (i), (ii), (iii), (iv)
- Reference: 250bis
- Inscription: 1986 (10th Session)
- Extensions: 2004
- Area: 21.88 ha (54.1 acres)
- Buffer zone: 16.715 ha (41.30 acres)
- Coordinates: 10°46′59″N 79°07′57″E

The Great Living Chola Temples is a UNESCO World Heritage Site designation for a group of three Chola dynasty era Hindu temples in the Indian state of Tamil Nadu. The temple at Thanjavur was added in the list in 1987, while the other two temples were added in 2004.

Completed between early 11th and the 12th century CE, the monuments include:

- Brihadisvara Temple at Thanjavur, built by Rajaraja I.
- Brihadisvara Temple at Gangaikonda Cholapuram, built by Rajendra Chola I.
- Airavatesvara Temple at Darasuram, built by Rajaraja II.

== World Heritage Site recognition ==
The Temple Complex at Thanjavur was recognised in 1987. The Temple Complex at Gangaikonda Cholapuram and the Airavatesvara Temple Complex were added as extensions to the site in 2004. The criteria for inclusion in the "Great Living Chola Temples" site are:

- Criterion (i): The three Chola temples of Southern India represent an outstanding creative achievement in the architectural conception of the pure form of the Dravidan type of temple.
- Criterion (ii): The Brihadisvara Temple at Thanjavur became the first great example of the Chola temples, followed by a development of which the other two properties also bear witness.
- Criterion (iii): The three Great Chola Temples are an exceptional and the most outstanding testimony to the development of the architecture of the Chola Empire and the Tamil civilization in Southern India.
- Criterion (iv): The Great Chola temples at Thanjavur, at Gangaikondacholapuram and Darasuram are outstanding examples of the architecture and the representation of the Chola ideology.

== Temples ==
Thanjavur is about 340 kilometres (210 mi) southwest of Chennai. Gangaikonda Cholapuram and Darasuram are respectively about 70 kilometres (43 mi) and about 40 kilometres (25 mi) to its northeast.

Location of Chola temples in the UNESCO world heritage site.

=== Brihadisvara Temple in Thanjavur ===
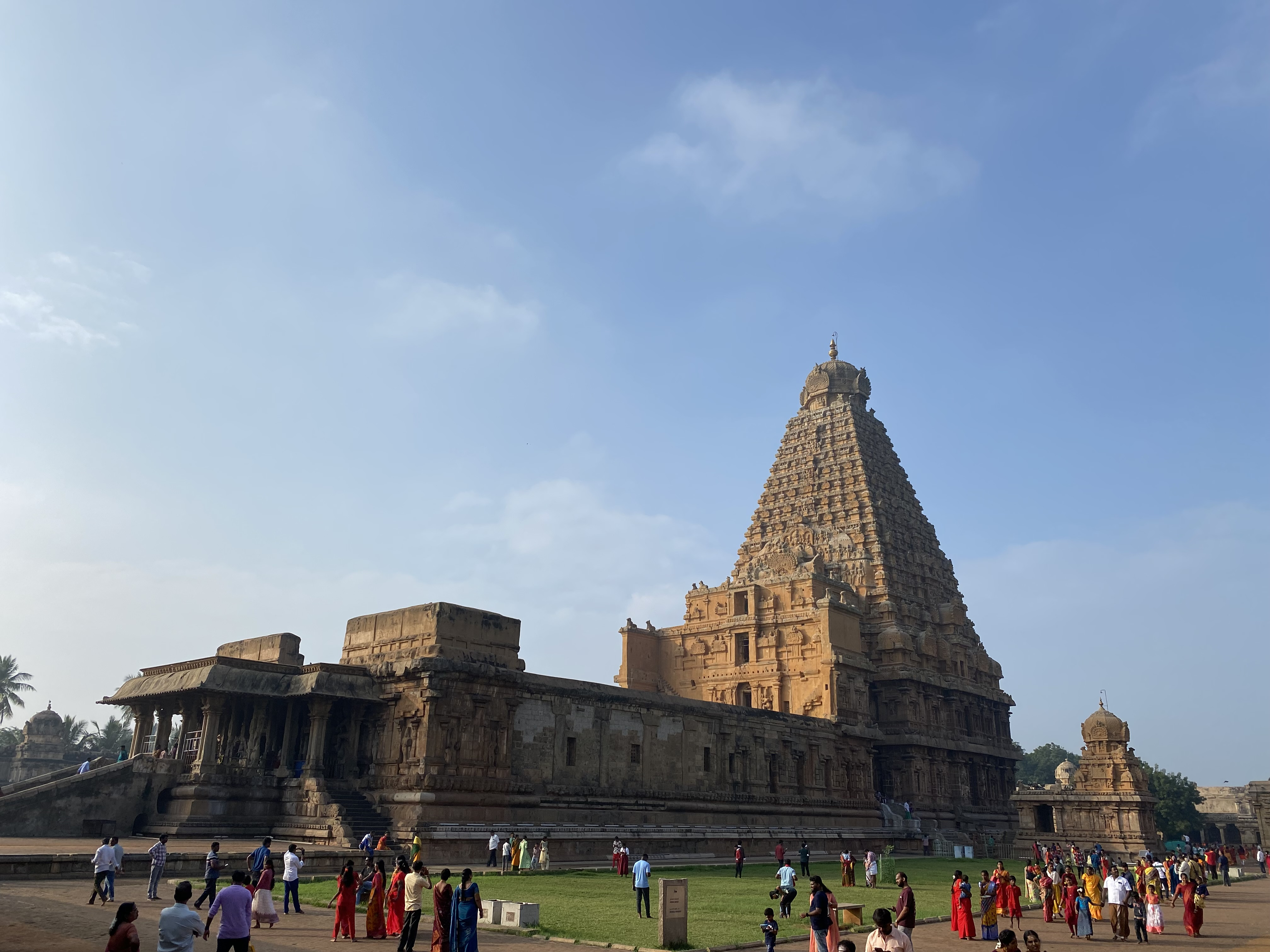
Brihadisvara Temple in Thanjavur

The Brihadisvara Temple at Thanjavur is a Hindu temple dedicated to Shiva. It is one of the largest South Indian temples and an exemplary example of fully realized Tamil architecture. Built by Raja Raja Chola I between 1003 and 1010 AD. The original monuments of this 11th century temple were built around a moat. It included gopura, the main temple, its massive tower, inscriptions, frescoes and sculptures predominantly related to Shaivism, but also of Vaishnvaism and Shaktism traditions of Hinduism. The temple was damaged in its history and some artwork is now missing. Additional mandapam and monuments were added in centuries that followed. The temple now stands amidst fortified walls that were added after the 16th century.

Built out of granite, the vimanam tower above the sanctum is one of the tallest in South India. The temple has a massive colonnaded prakara (corridor) and one of the largest Shiva linga in India. It is also famed for the quality of its sculpture, as well as being the location that commissioned the brass Nataraja – Shiva as the lord of dance, in 11th century. The complex includes shrines for Nandi, Amman, Subrahmanyar, Ganesha, Sabhapati, Dakshinamurti, Chandesrvarar, Varahi and others. The temple is one of the most visited tourist attractions in Tamil Nadu.

=== Brihadisvara Temple in Gangaikonda Cholapuram ===
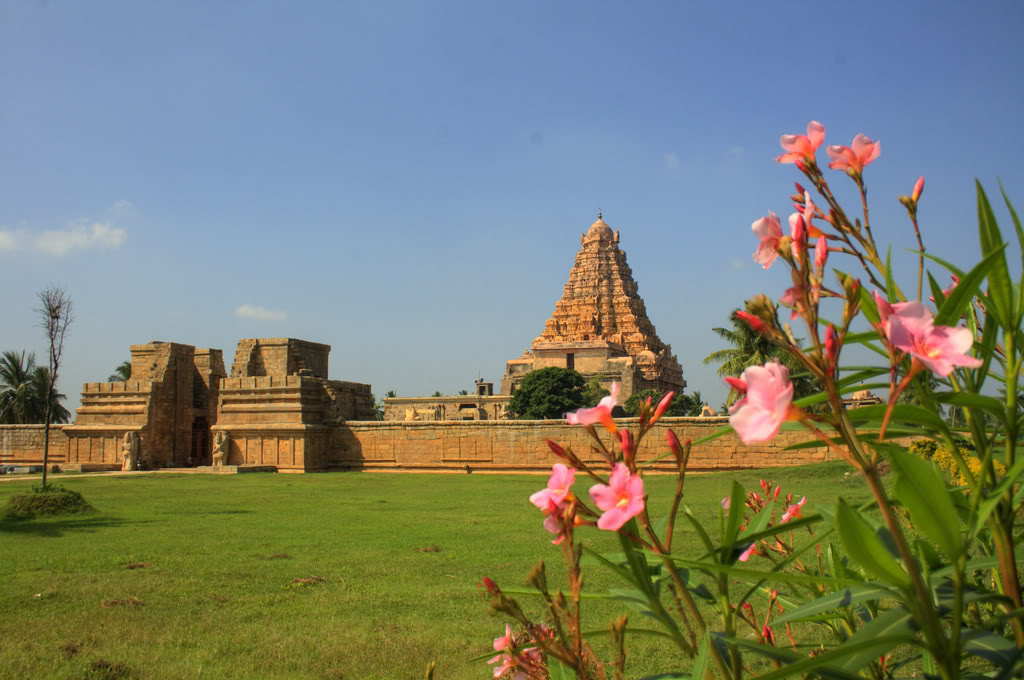
Brihadisvara Temple in Gangaikonda Cholapuram

The Brihadisvara Temple at Gangaikonda Cholapuram is a Hindu temple located at Gangaikonda Cholapuram about 70 kilometres (43 mi) from the Thanjavur Brihadisvara Temple. This temple was completed in 1035 AD by Rajendra Chola I as a part of his new capital, this Chola dynasty era temple is similar in design and has a similar name as the 11th century, and sometimes just called the Gangaikondacholapuram temple.

It is dedicated to Shiva and based on a square plan, but the temple reverentially displays Vaishnavism, Shaktism and syncretic equivalence themes of Hinduism with statues of Vishnu, Durga, Surya, Harihara, Ardhanishvara, and others. In addition to the main shrine with linga, the temple complex has a number of smaller shrines, gopura, and other monuments, with some partially ruined or restored in later centuries. The temple is famed for its bronze sculptures, artwork on its walls, the Nandi and the scale of its curvilinear tower.

=== Airavatesvara Temple ===
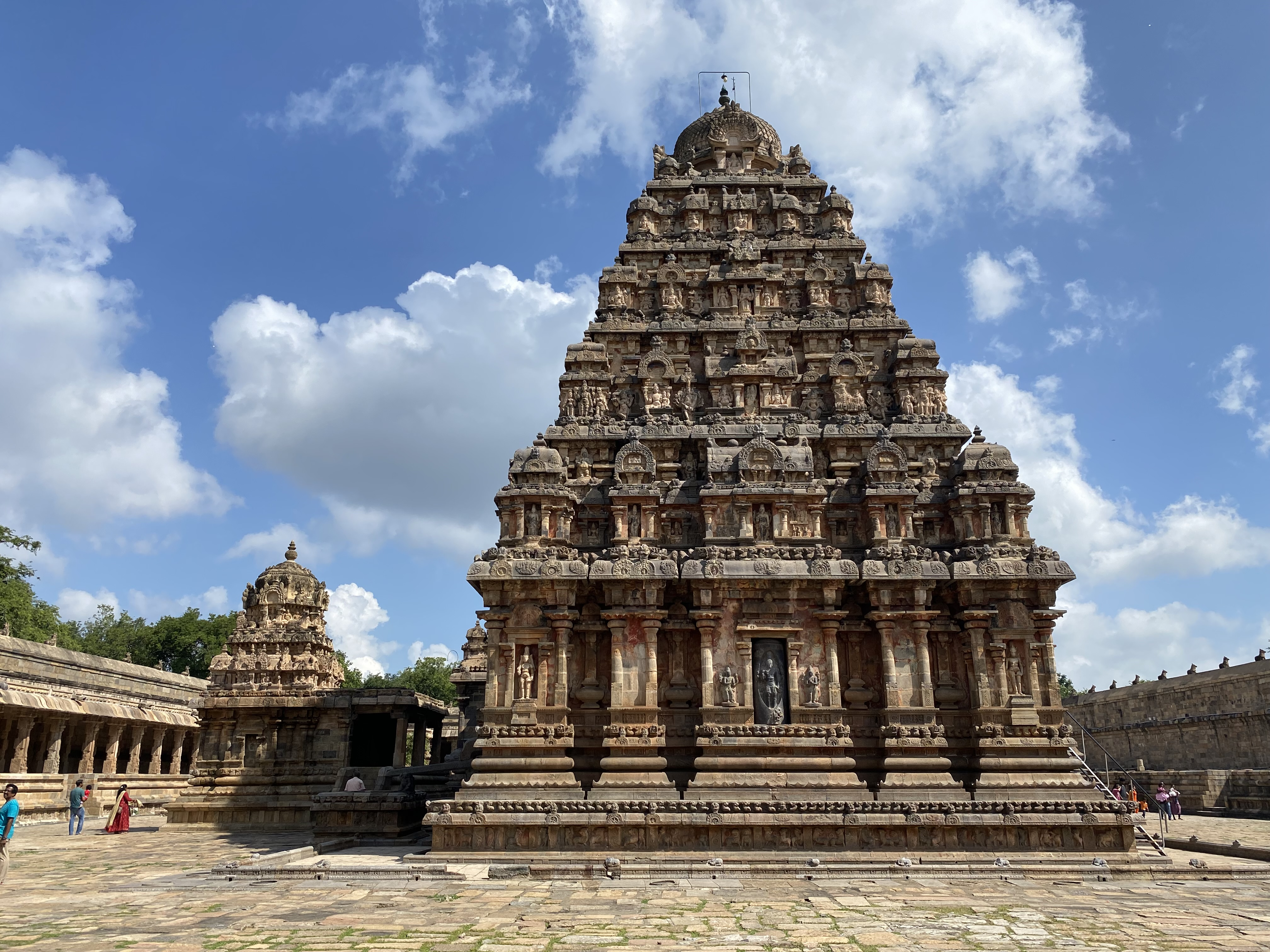
Airavatesvara Temple

The Airavatesvara Temple is at Darasuram, in the outskirt of the city of Kumbakonam, completed in 1166 AD. It is one among a cluster of eighteen medieval era large Hindu temples in the Kumbakonam area. The temple is dedicated to Lord Shiva. It also reverentially displays Vaishnavism and Shaktism traditions of Hinduism, along with the legends associated with sixty three Nayanars – the Bhakti movement saints of Shaivism.

Named after Airavata, Indra's white elephant, the Airavatesvara Temple is part of the Great Living Chola Temples, a group of three major Chola-era temples in Tamil Nadu, India. It is the last of the three temples built under successive Chola rulers, beginning with Rajaraja I, and was constructed by Rajaraja II around c. 1150 CE. The temple is noted for the Rajagambhira Thirumandapam ("Royal Courtyard"), which features intricately carved pillars, long granite steps, and stone chariots drawn by horses. The site is located at Darasuram, near Kumbakonam.

The stone temple incorporates a chariot structure, and includes major Vedic and Puranic deities such as Indra, Agni, Varuna, Vayu, Brahma, Surya, Vishnu, Saptamtrikas, Durga, Saraswati, Sri Devi (Lakshmi), Ganga, Yamuna, Subrahmanya, Ganesha, Kama, Rati and others. The temple was much larger and once had seven courtyards according to inscriptions. Only one courtyard survives; parts of the temple such as the gopuram are in ruins, and the main temple and the main temple and associated shrines stand alone. The temple continues to attract large gatherings of Hindu pilgrims every year.

== Gallery ==
Brihadisvara Temple in Thanjavur

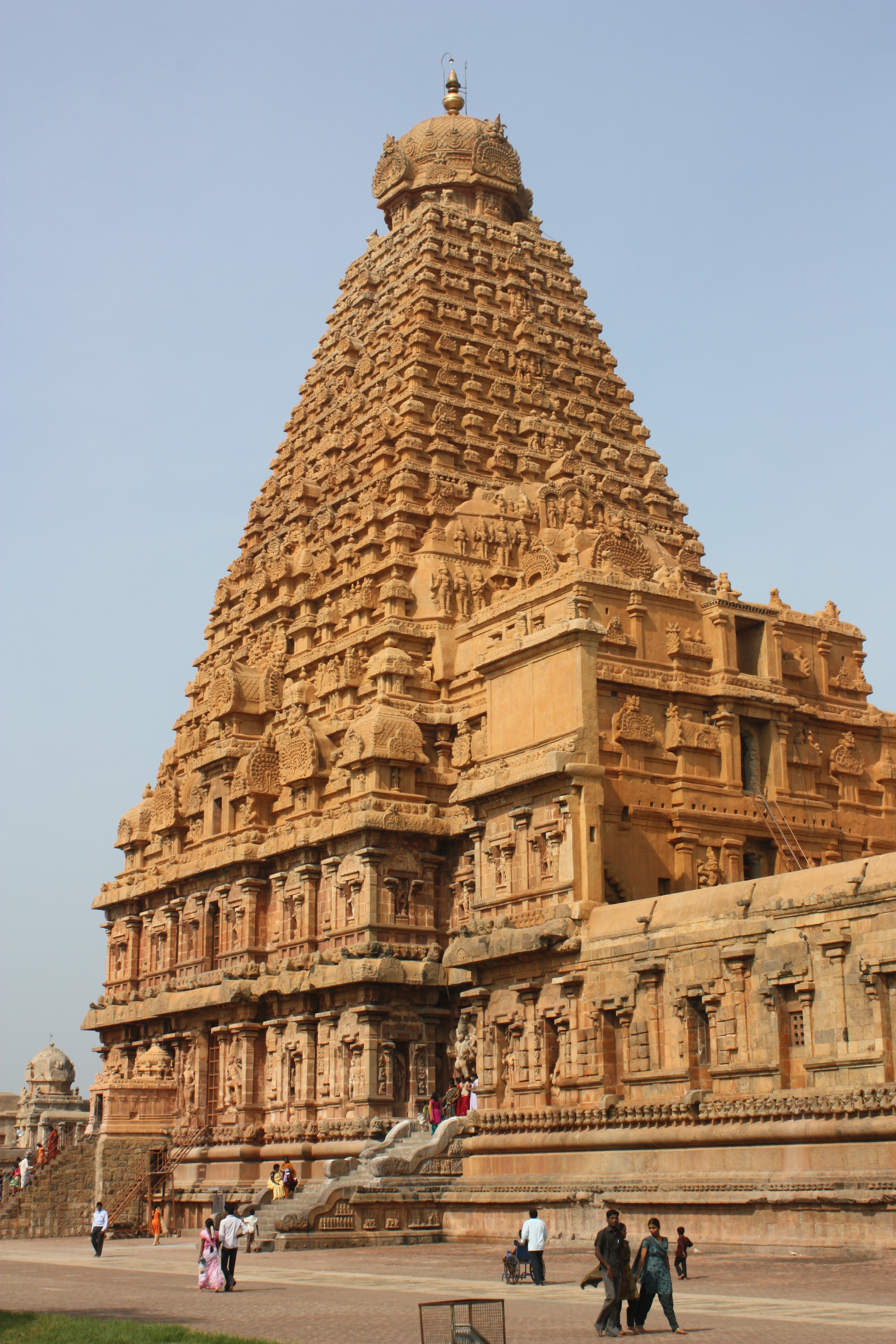
View of the Śrī Vimāna of the Thanjavur Temple

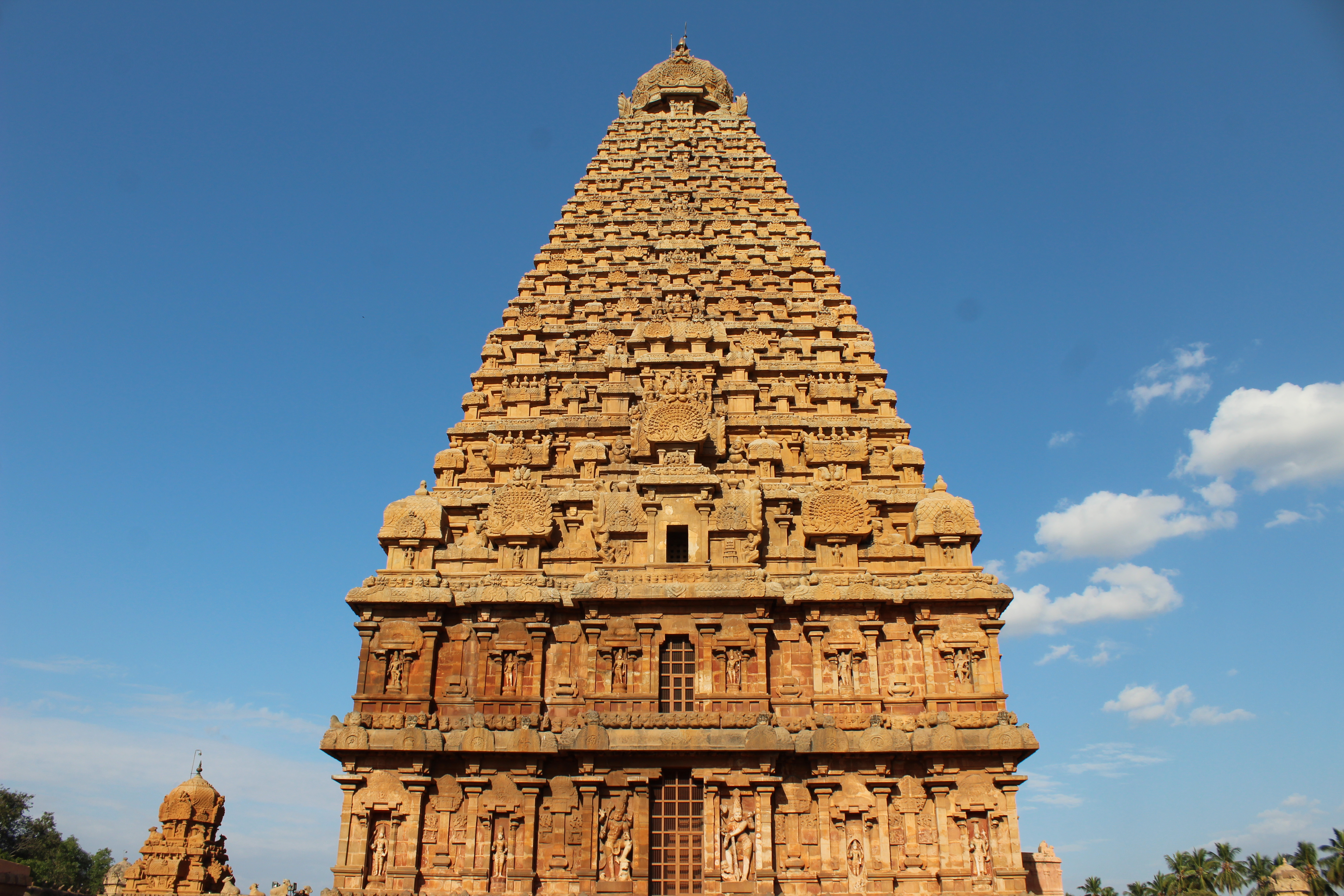
The granite gopuram (tower) of the Thanjavur Temple

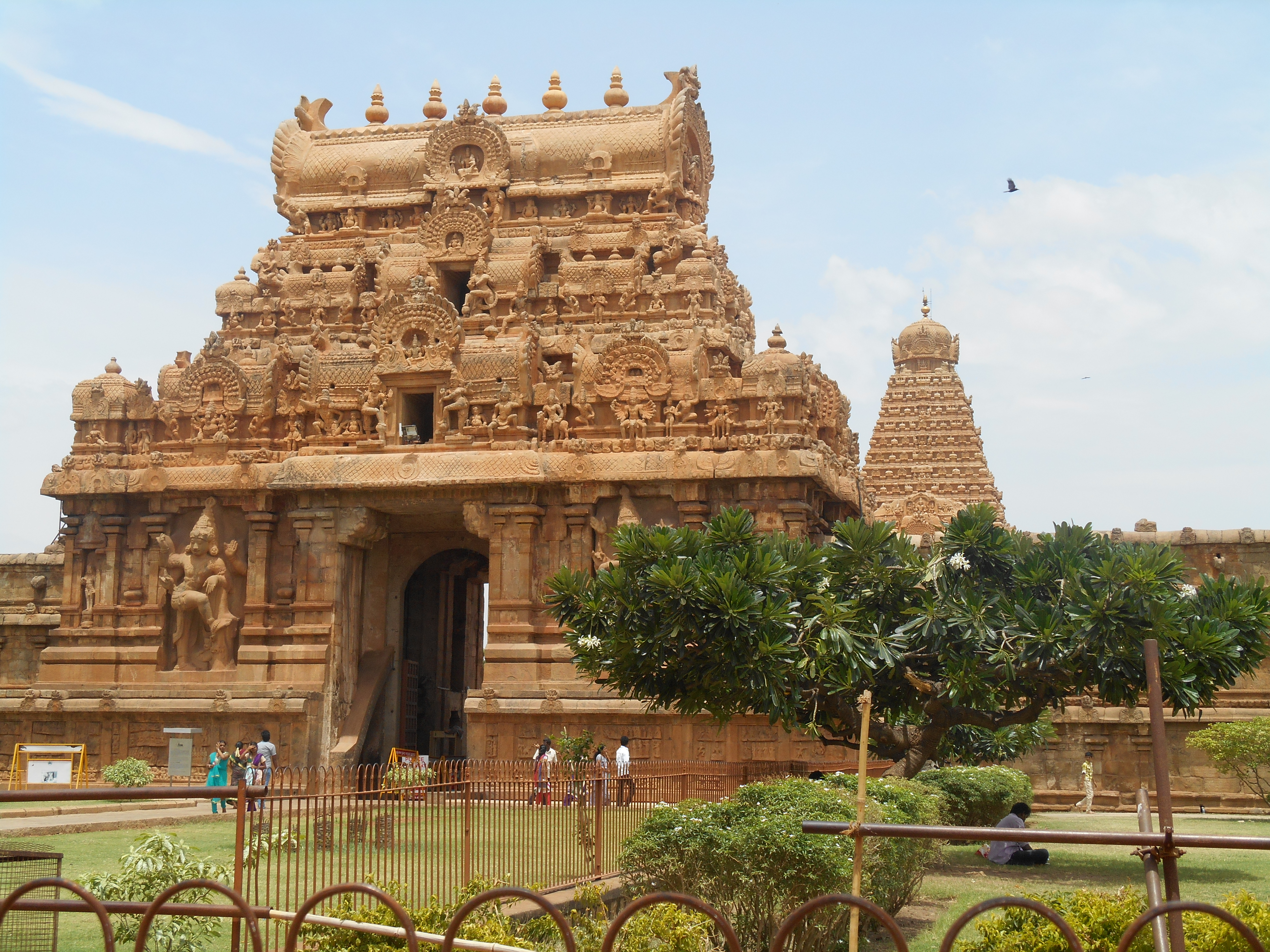
Temple entrance gopurams at Thanjavur

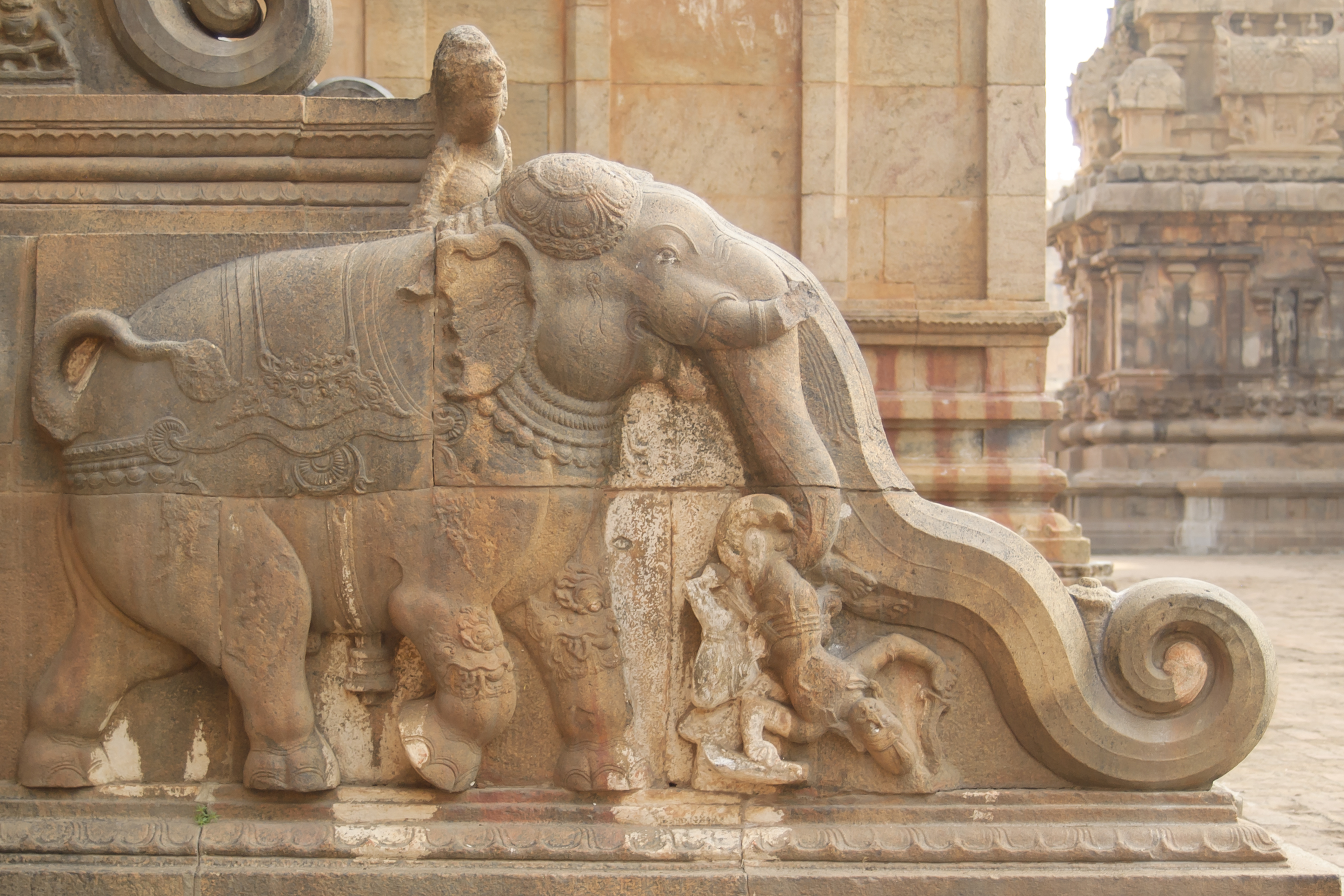
An elephant relief on the Thanjavur temple

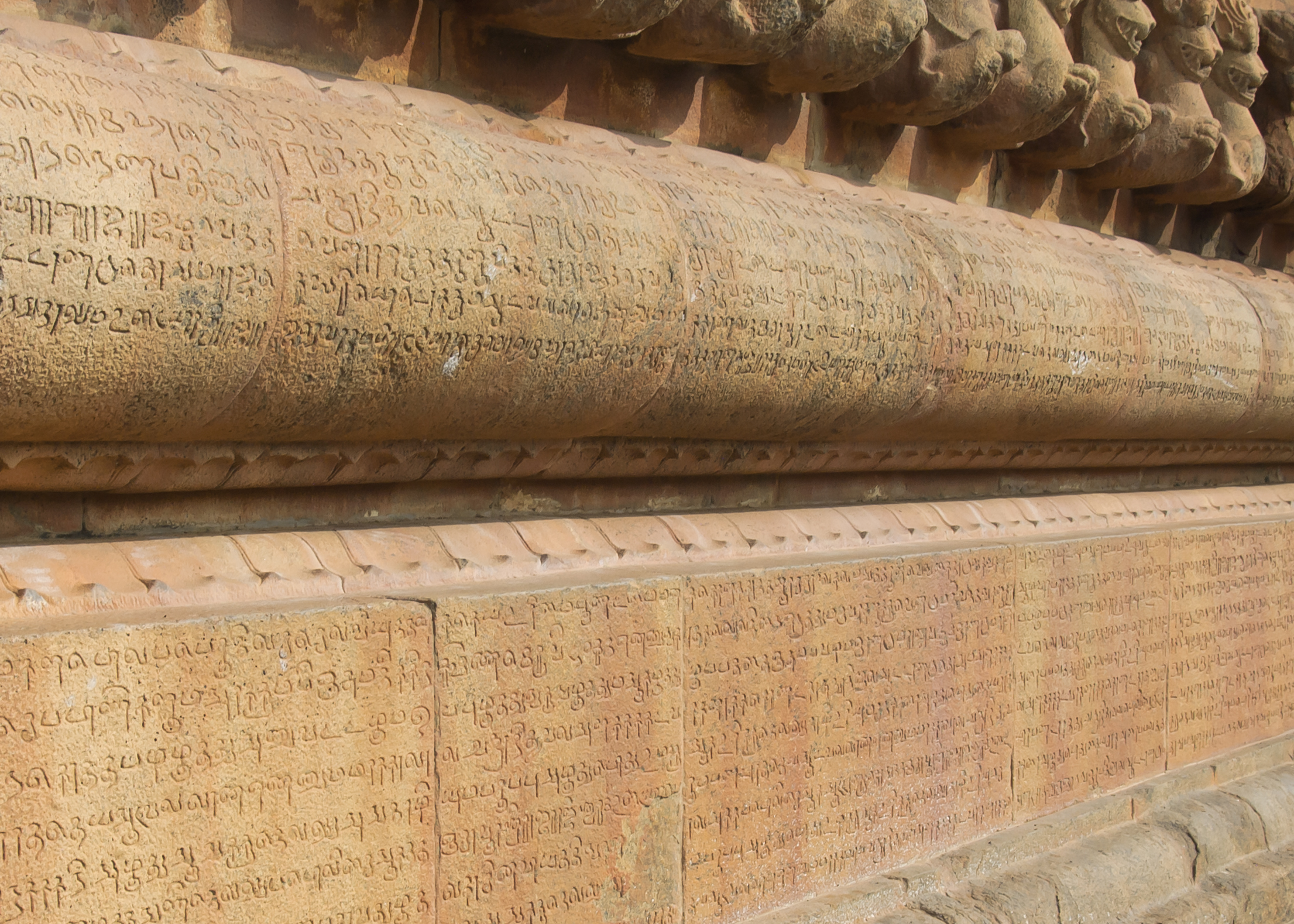
Tamil written on the Thanjavur Temple
Brihadisvara Temple in Gangaikonda Cholapuram

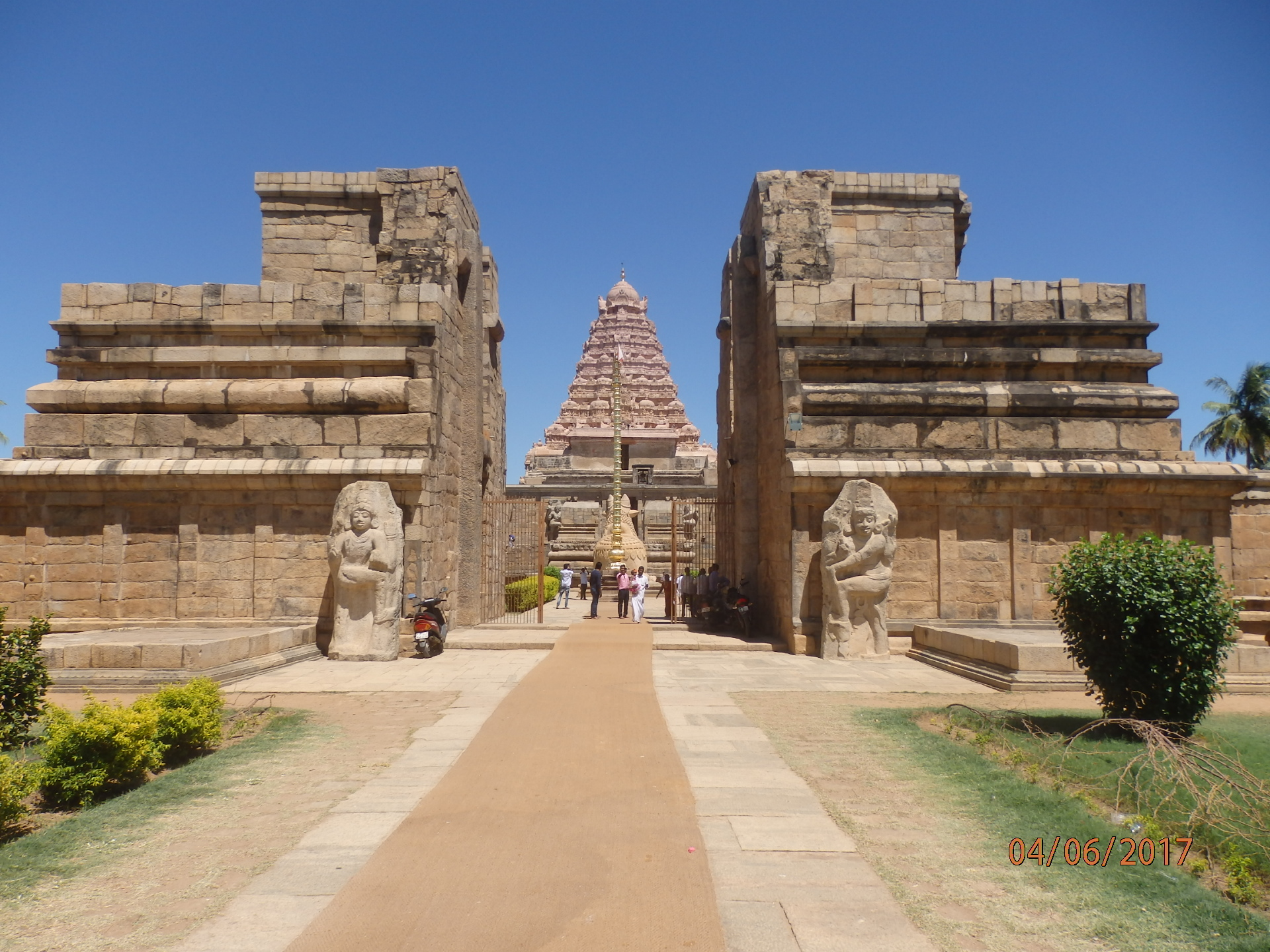
The entrance leads into a grand complex

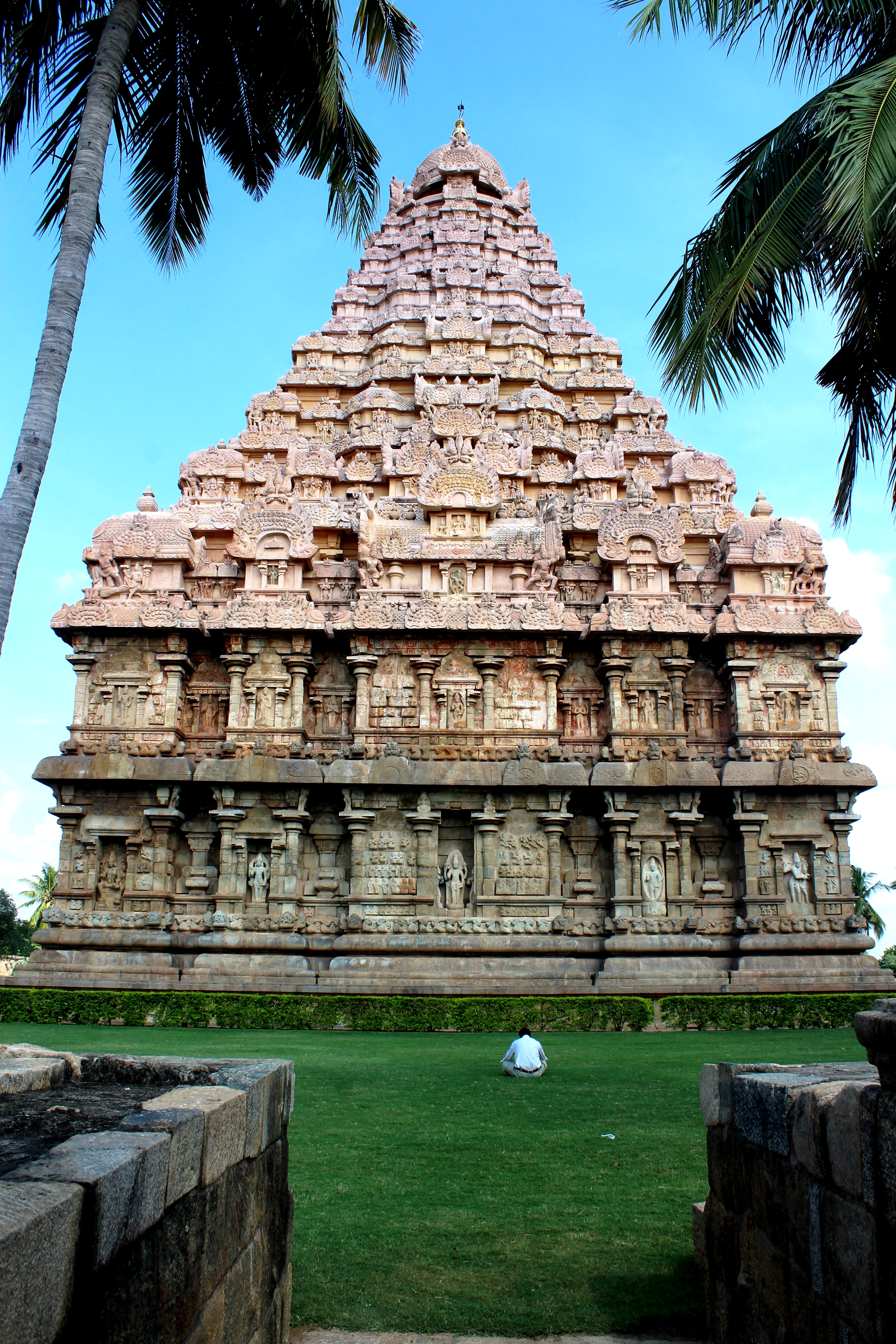
The pyramidal structure above the sanctum at the Gangaikonda Cholapuram Temple

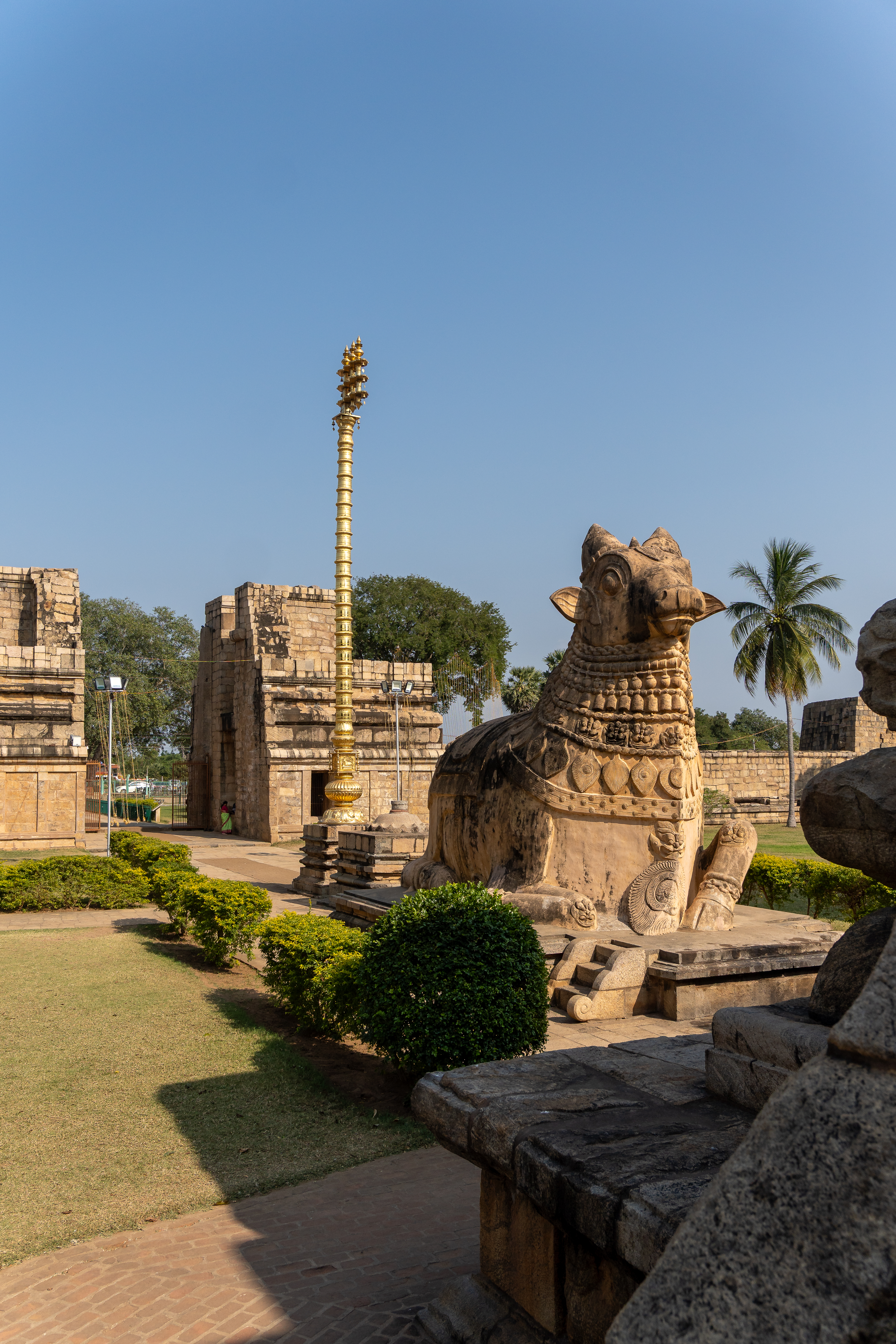
Nandi

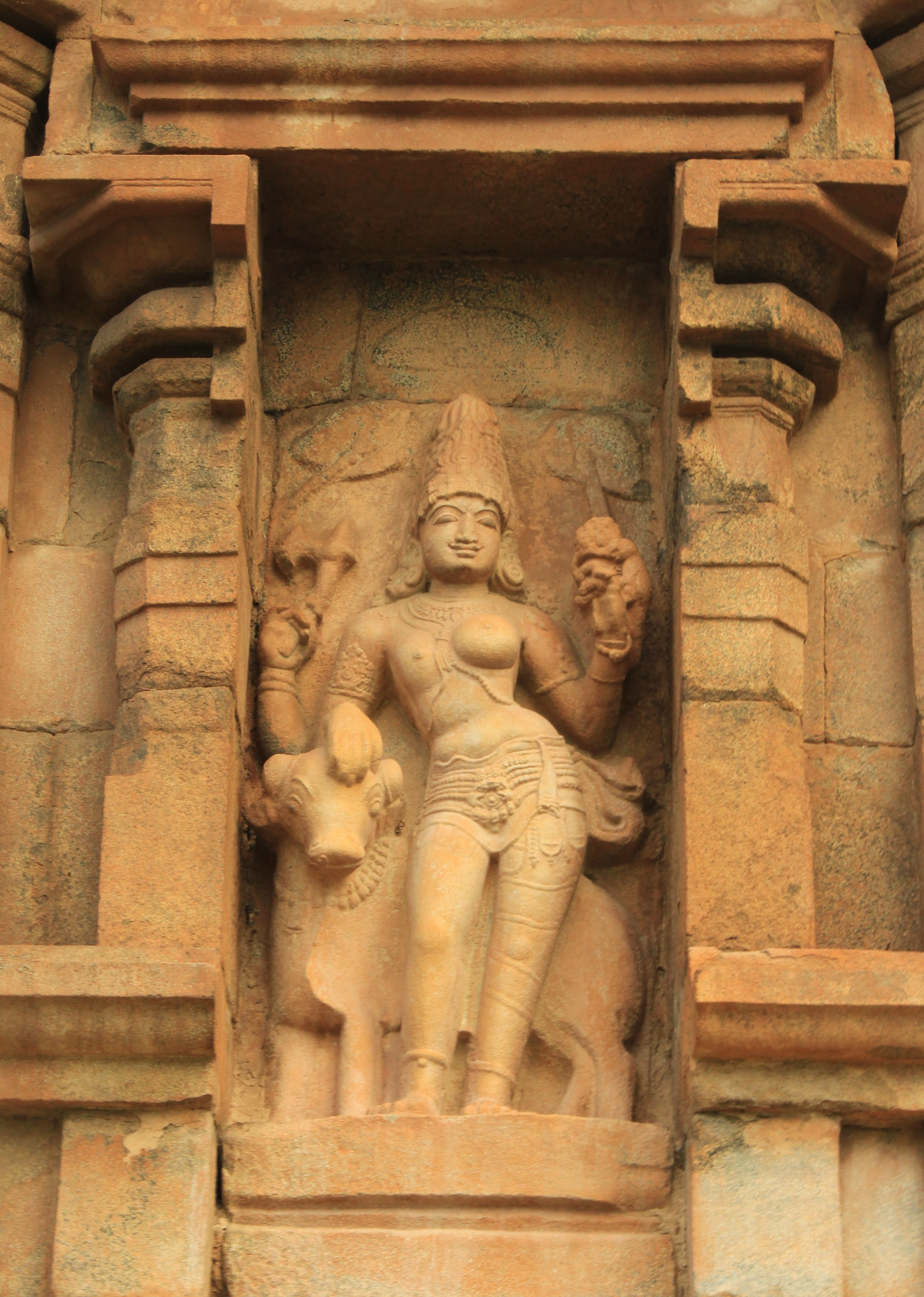
Ardhanarishvara (half Shiva, half Parvati): sculpture at Gangaikonda Cholapuram

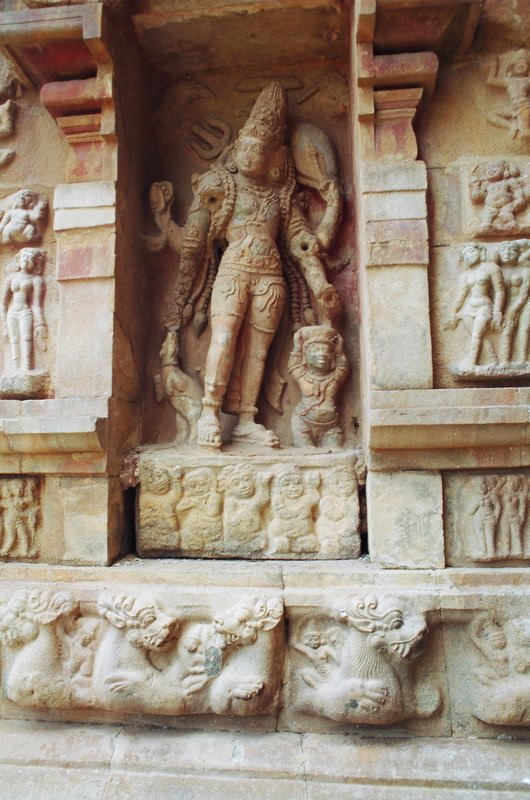
Stone sculpture at Gangaikonda Cholapuram
Airavatesvara Temple

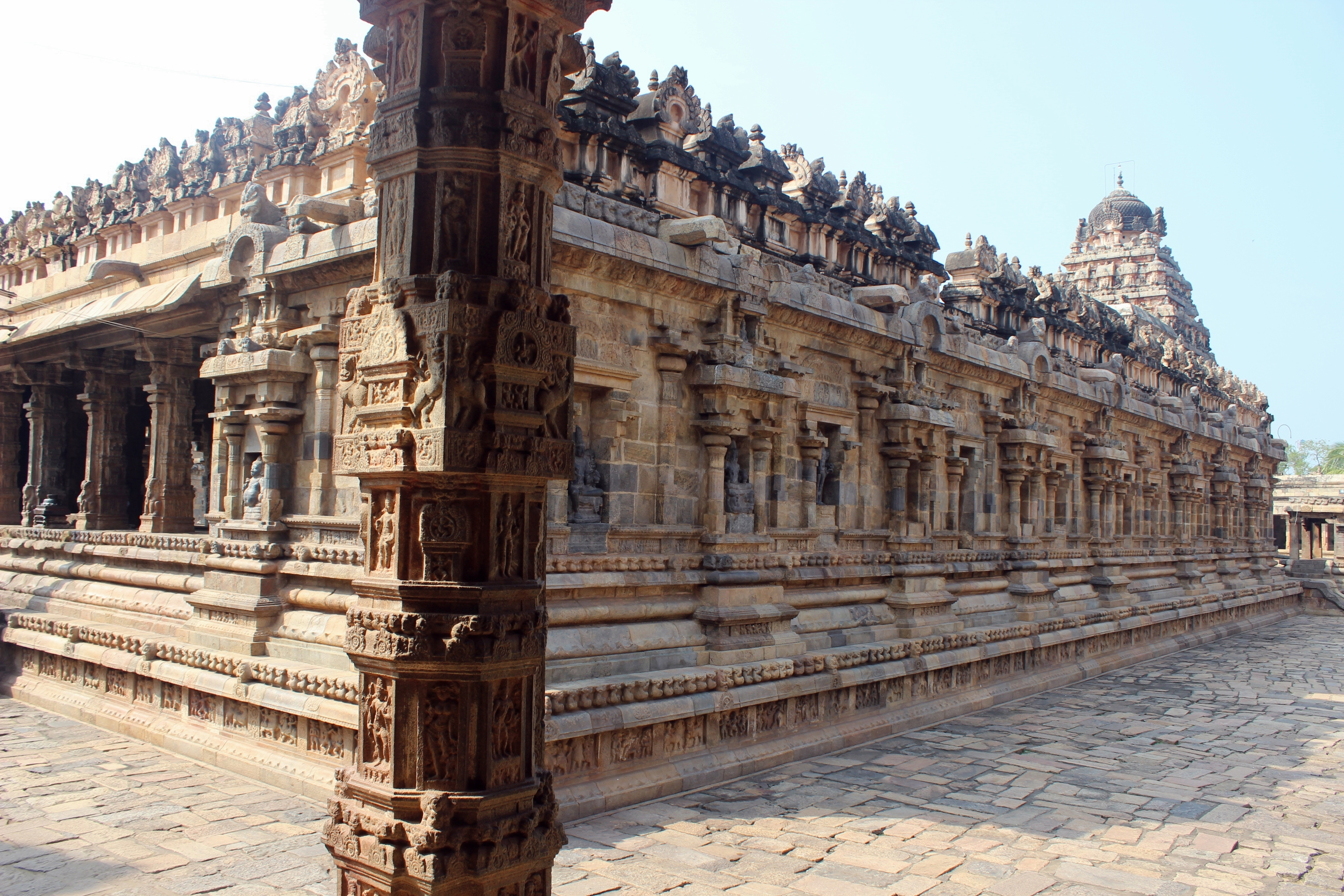
A pillar in Dravidian architectural-style in Airavatesvara Temple

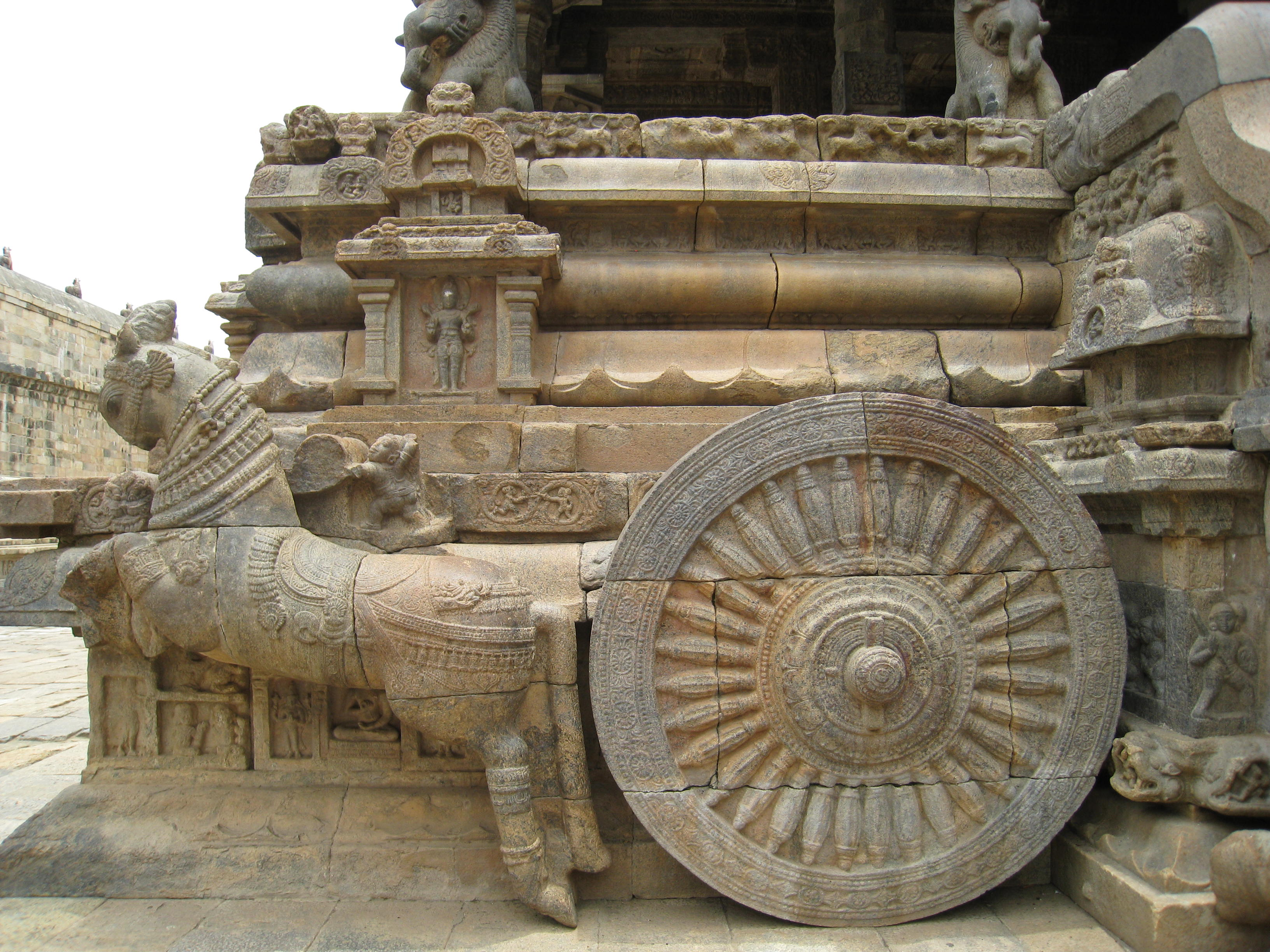
Chariot detail of the Airavatesvara Temple

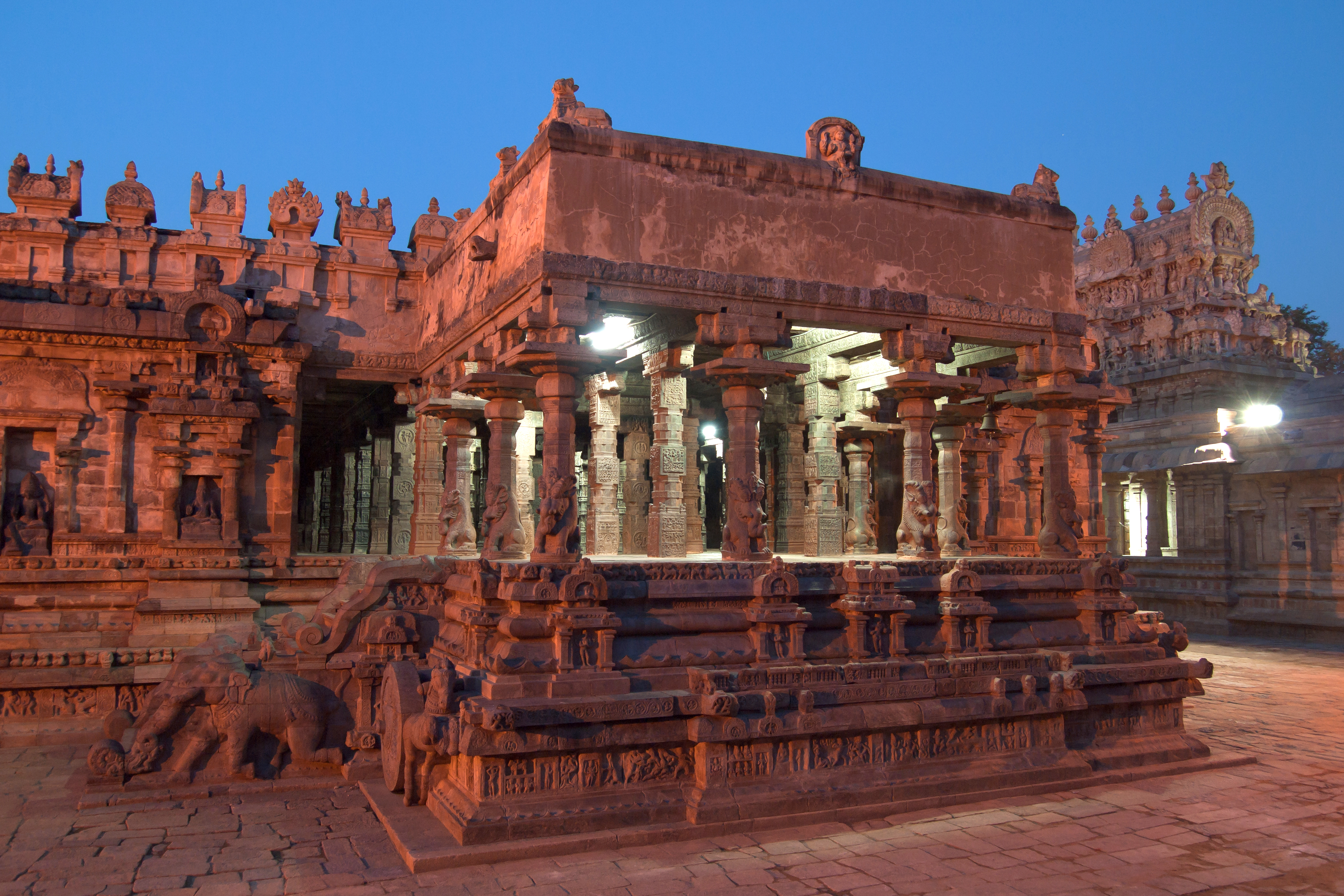
Altar

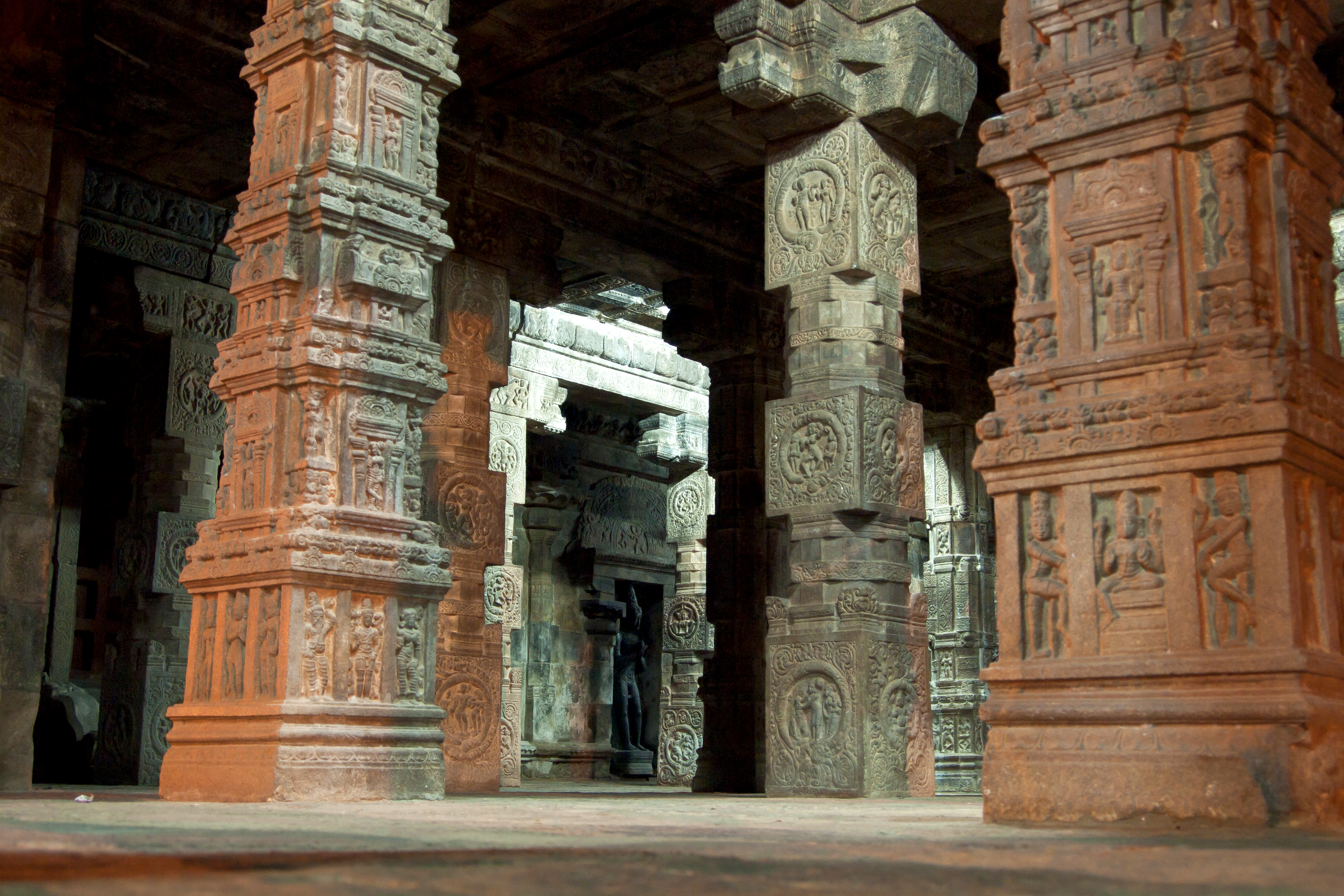
Pillars

== Sources ==
- Ayyar, P.V. Jagadisa (1993). South Indian Shrines. New Delhi: Asian Educational Services. ISBN 81-206-0151-3.
- Chaitanya, Krishna (1987). Arts of India. Abhinav Publications.
- Davis, Richard (1997). Lives of Indian images. Princeton, N.J: Princeton University Press. ISBN 0-691-00520-6.
- S.R. Balasubrahmanyam (1979). Later Chola Temples. Thomson Press. OCLC 6921015.
- S.R. Balasubrahmanyam (1975). Middle Chola Temples. Thomson Press. ISBN 978-9060236079.
- Michell, George (1988). The Hindu Temple: An Introduction to Its Meaning and Forms. Chicago: University of Chicago Press. ISBN 0-226-53230-5.
