= Veerabhadra Temple =

Veerabhadra Temple may refer to:

- Veerabhadra Temple, Lepakshi, a temple in Lepakshi, Anantapur district, Andhra Pradesh, India
- Veerabhadra Temple, Yadur, a temple in Belgaum district, Karnataka, India
- Veerabhadra Temple, Pattiseema, a templle in middle of Godavari river, Andhra Pradesh, India
