= Nandi Awards =

Annual award in Telugu cinema and television (1964–2016)

- Current: Nandi Awards of 2016
- Awarded for: Excellence in cinematic achievements for Telugu cinema Telugu theatre Telugu television
- Sponsored by: Government of Andhra Pradesh
- Country: India
- Presented by: Andhra Pradesh Film, Television and Theatre Development Corporation
- Status: Active
- Established: 1964
- First award: 1964
- Final award: 2016
- Website: apsftvtdc.in/nandi-awards

The Nandi Awards are annual awards presented by the Government of Andhra Pradesh to recognise excellence in Telugu cinema, theatre, and television, as well as lifetime achievements in Indian cinema. The awards were named after the monolithic sculpture of the sacred bull in Hinduism, Nandi, at Lepakshi, a cultural and historical symbol of the Telugu people.

The Nandi Awards were categorised into four levels: Swarnam (Gold), Rajatam (Silver), Kamsyam (Bronze), and Raagi (Copper). In addition to film and television awards, the government also presented the Nandi Natakotsavam Awards to honour outstanding contributions in social, mythological, and poetic dramas in Telugu theatre.

== History ==
The Government of Andhra Pradesh commissioned the Nandi Film Awards to recognise and commend the best films produced in the Telugu language in Andhra Pradesh from 1964 onwards. The objective of the film awards is to encourage the production of films in the Telugu language with high technical excellence and aesthetic values bearing cultural, educational, and social relevance and also promoting the integration and unity of the nation. Awards were given annually and were presented in a public event on Ugadi, Telugu New Year Day. The Government had transferred the activity relating to conferring Nandi Awards to the Film Television and Theatre Development Corporation. Since 1998, the awards have been organised by them.

The Awards were given in the categories of feature films, feature films on national integration, children's films, documentary films, educational films, and books/articles on Telugu cinema in Telugu language for the best films, producers, directors, artistes, and technicians. The awards were usually in the form of Golden Nandi, Silver Nandi, Bronze Nandi, and Copper Nandi, in addition to medals, and commendation certificates.

== Selection criteria ==
Annually, a state panel appointed by the Government of Andhra Pradesh selected the winning entries and the Chief Minister of Andhra Pradesh presented the awards at the public ceremony. A list of rules was presented every year in a document of regulations. The criteria for eligibility included many clauses. Among them is a direct requirement that the film, and particularly the feature films entering the competition, should be produced in Andhra Pradesh and Telangana, and in the case of co-production involving a foreign entity, there were as many conditions which should be fulfilled in order for the film to qualify.

In order to be eligible for consideration of the jury, a film should have been certified by the Central Board of Film Certification between 1 January and 31 December. The Government did not have influence over which films are selected for consideration and which films ultimately win the award. However, there were strict criteria which determined whether a film was eligible for consideration by the jury panels.

== Honorary Awards – Gold ==
=== Raghupathi Venkaiah Award ===
The award is named after Raghupathi Venkaiah Naidu, and presented annually to "an eminent film personality for his outstanding contribution to Telugu cinema." (since 1980).

=== NTR National Award ===
The NTR National Award is named in the memory of former chief minister and actor N. T. Rama Rao, and is presented to "an eminent film personality every year for outstanding contribution to the growth and development of Indian Cinema." (since 1996).

=== BN Reddy National Award ===
The award is named after director B. N. Reddy and is presented to "an eminent film director for outstanding contribution to the growth and development of the Indian Cinema," annually from 2009. The awardee receives a cash price of ₹2 lakh, a special memento, citation and shawl.

- 2008: K. B. Tilak (director and producer)
- 2009: K. Raghavendra Rao (film director)
- 2011: Shyam Benegal (film director)
- 2012: Singeetam Srinivasa Rao (director and producer)
- 2013: A. Kodandarami Reddy (director)
- 2014: S. S. Rajamouli (director)
- 2015: Trivikram Srinivas (director)
- 2016: Boyapati Srinu (director)

=== Nagireddy–Chakrapani National Award ===
Named after filmmakers, Nagi Reddi and Chakrapani, the award is presented annually since 2009 to "an eminent film producer or writer or technician or infrastructure provider to the film industry for outstanding growth and development of Indian cinema every year." The awardee receives a cash price of ₹2 lakh, a special memento, citation and shawl.

- 2008: Akkineni Ramesh Prasad – (film producer)
- 2009: Ramoji Rao – (film producer)
- 2010: M. Saravanan and Balasubramanian
- 2011: G. Adiseshagiri Rao – (film producer)
- 2012: Daggubati Suresh Babu – (film producer)
- 2013: Dil Raju – (film producer)
- 2014: R. Narayan Reddy (producer)
- 2015: M. M. Keeravani (music director)
- 2016: K. S. Rama Rao (producer)

== Gold ==
- Best Feature Films – Gold, Silver and Bronze: since 1964
- Sarojini Devi Award for a Film on National Integration: since 1983
- Best Children Films – Gold and Silver: since 1978
- Best Documentary Films – Gold and Silver: since 1968
- Best Popular Feature Film: since 2005

== Silver ==
- Best Actor: since 1977
- Best Actress: since 1977
- Best Director: since 1981
- Akkineni Award for Best Home-viewing Feature Film: since 1991
- Best Educational Film: since 1981

== Copper ==
- Best Story Writer: since 1965
- Best Cinematographer: since 1977
- Best Music Director: since 1977
- Best Male Playback Singer: since 1977
- Best Female Playback Singer: since 1977
- Best Lyricist: since 1977
- Best Child Actress: since 1977
- Best Screenplay Writer: since 1978
- Best First Film of a Director: since 1981
- Best Supporting Actor: since 1981
- Best Supporting Actress: since 1981
- Best Audiographer: since 1981
- Special Jury Award: since 1981
- Best Child Actor: since 1981
- Best Editor: since 1981
- Best Art Director: 1981
- Best Makeup Artist: since 1981
- Best Dialogue Writer: since 1983
- Best Male Comedian: since 1985
- Best Choreographer: since 1985
- Best Villain: since 1985
- Best Costume Designer: since 1985
- Best Character Actor: since 1994
- Best Character Actress: since 1994
- Best Book on Telugu Cinema: since 1995
- Best Film Critic on Telugu Cinema: since 1995
- Best Male Dubbing Artist: since 1997
- Best Female Dubbing Artist: since 1997
- Best Female Comedian: since 1999
- Best Fight Master: since 1999
- Best Special Effects: since 2005

== Nandi Award for Best Educational Film ==
Since 1981, a Nandi Award for Best Educational Film has been attributed, although it was not awarded even year.

Year	Film	Winner
1981	Manchineeti Saraphara	C. D. Kishore
1984	Polio	K. S. Ch. Bose
1985	Bhoosara Pariksha	K. S. Ch. Bose
1986	Keetakalu Prakruthi Yokka Adbutha Vara Prasadam	
1990	Dhanalakshmi Kataksham	
2000	Madhura Kshanam (Aid for AIDS)	Alla Rambabu
2005	Blue	T. Sulthan
2007	Good Bad Ugly	Magapu Suryakamala
2008	Adavi Naa Thalliro	Alla Rambabu
2009	Vimukti	

== See also ==
- Telangana Gaddar Film Awards
