= Virabhadra =

Form of Hindu god Shiva

- War
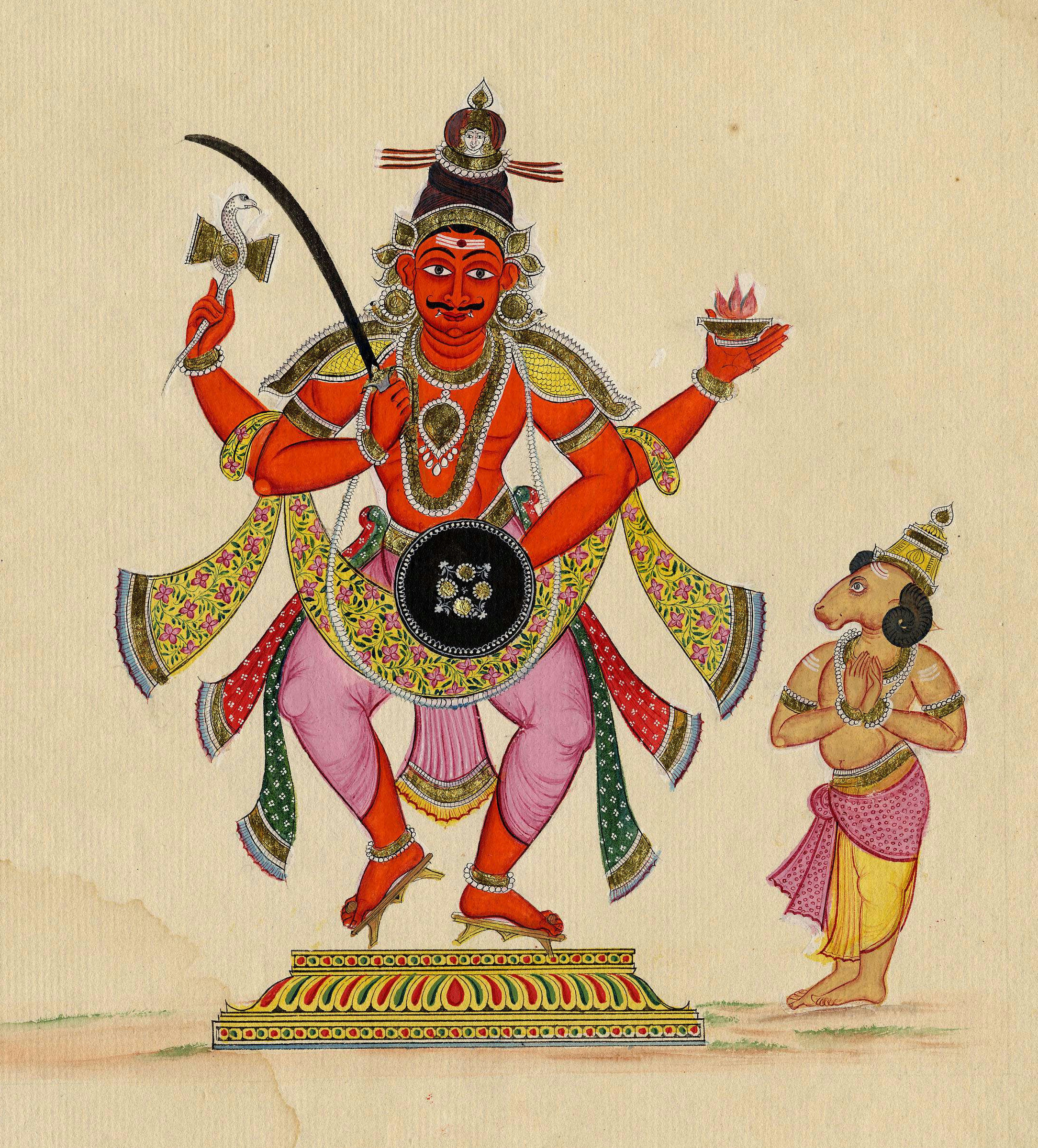
- Virabhadra and Daksha
- Other names: Virabhadreshvara; Vira; Hari; Haribhadra; Virarudra; Bhadra
- Affiliation: Shiva
- Abode: Śivapura above Brahmaloka
- Planet: Angaraka (Mars)
- Mantra: oṃ vīrabhadrāya namaḥ; oṃ vīrarudrāya namaḥ; oṃ śrī vīrabhadreśvarāya namaḥ; oṃ hroum hum vāṁ vīrabhadrāya namaḥ; oṃ vīrabhadrāya vidmahe gaṇeśvarāya dhīmahi tanno śāntaḥ pracodayāt
- Weapon: trident, sword, arrow, discus, conch, spear, staff, thunderbolt, two varieties of shields, bow, noose, goad, axe, and club.
- Battles: Daksha Yajna, Narasimha Samhara
- Day: Tuesday
- Mount: Lion; Horse; Nandi (bull)
- Texts: Vayu Purana, Skanda Purana, Kurma Purana, Linga Purana, Shiva Purana, Vamana Purana
- Festivals: Maha Shivaratri; Shravana; Kalashtami
- Consort: Bhadrakali

Virabhadra (Sanskrit: वीरभद्र, romanized: Vīrabhadra, lit. 'auspicious hero'), also rendered Veerabhadra, is a fierce form of the Hindu god Shiva. He is created by the wrath of Shiva, when the deity hurls a lock of his matted hair upon the ground, upon hearing of the self-immolation of his consort, Sati, at the Daksha yajna.

He appears in the Puranas as a vengeful being, attacking the deities who had attended the Daksha yajna with Bhadrakali. In the ensuing melee, Bhaga's eyes are plucked out, Agni, Mitra, and Chandra are also accosted. The fate of Daksha himself varies from text to text: Virabhadra either decapitates him, urges him to beg forgiveness from Shiva, or is saved temporarily by Vishnu, who defeats Virabhadra (but gets decapitated later).

== Legend ==
=== Origin ===
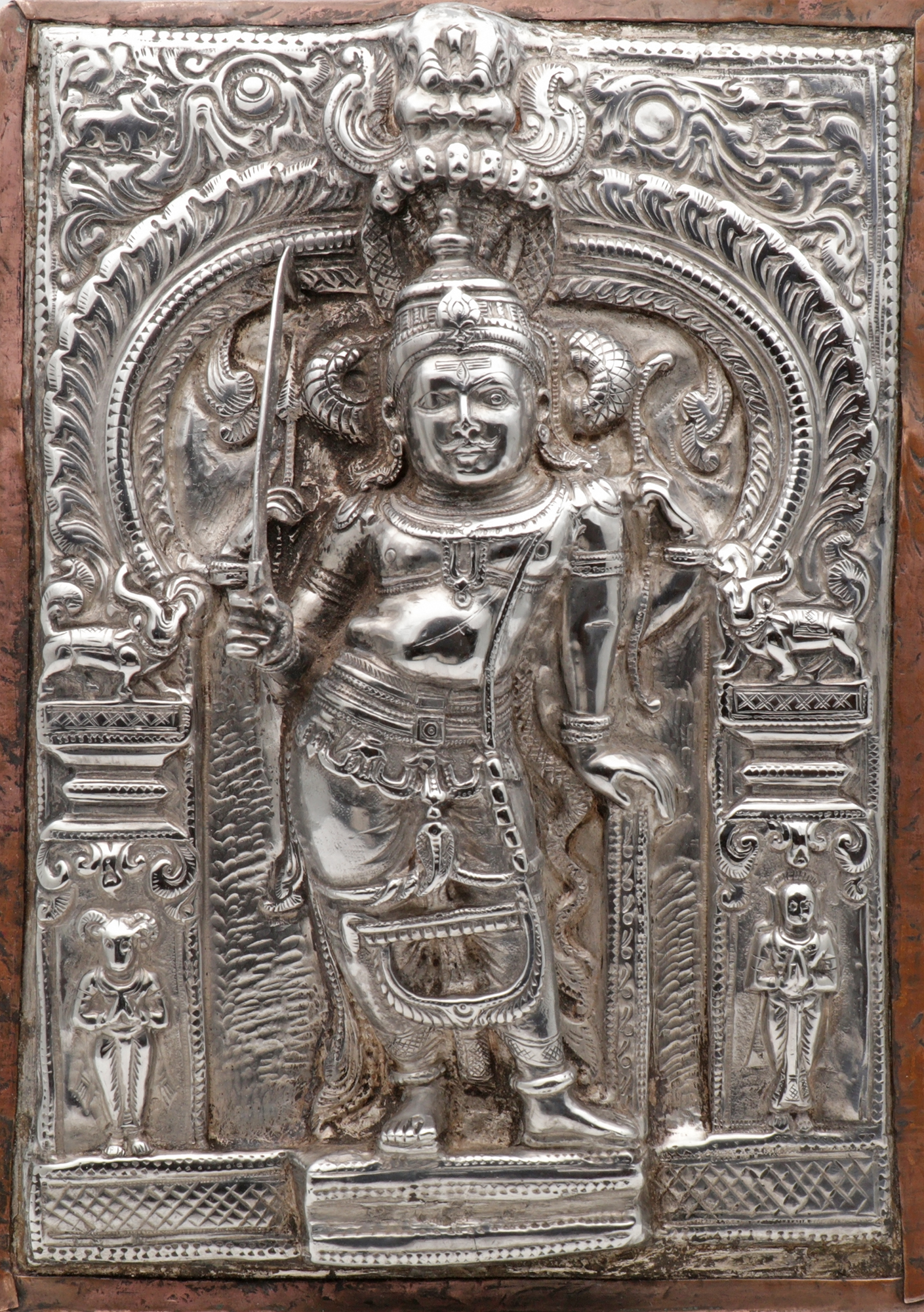
Virabhadra devotional plaque Notes

Virabhadra was created by Shiva after Sati, Shiva's wife, immolated herself during the Daksha Yajña.

The origin of the Daksha Yajña legend lies in Taittirīya Samhita 2.6.8, where Rudra (later Shiva) was excluded from the sacrifice by the Devas, then Rudra pierced the sacrifice. Pushan lost his teeth and Bhaga got blinded. This legend is also mentioned in the Shatapatha Brāhmana of the Shukla Yajurveda and in the Gopatha Brāhmana of the Atharvaveda. The Gopatha Brāhmana version mentions Prajapati as the one who excluded Rudra from the sacrifice. In post-Vedic literature, Daksha Prajapati excluded Shiva from the Yajña.

According to Shaivism, Virabhadra's origins are described as follows: Sati was the youngest daughter of Daksha. While growing up, she had her heart set on Shiva and worshipped him. During the svayamvara of Sati, Daksha invited all the Devas and princes except Shiva. Sati cast her garland into the air, calling upon Shiva to receive it, and beheld him to be standing in the midst of the court, with the garland about his neck. Daksha had no choice but to accept the marriage of his daughter to Shiva.

One day, Daksha invited all the deities, as well as all of his children and grandchildren, in order to perform a ritual sacrifice, deliberately not inviting Sati and Shiva. Sati's urge to attend the event, due to her affection towards her parents, overpowered the social etiquette of not going to an uninvited ceremony. When Shiva refused to accompany her, Sati insisted on attending the ritual without him. Upon her arrival, Daksha started to humiliate her and her husband, expressing his hatred for Shiva in front of the entire assembly of people. Unable to bear the ignominy, the furious Sati leapt into the sacrificial fire, immolating herself with her yogic abilities. When Shiva heard of these tidings, he tore a clump of his matted hair, from which Virabhadra and Bhadrakali emerged. Shiva instructed Virabhadra to lay waste to the sacrifice, and destroy all of its participants. Veerabhadra is a small element of Shiva. Shiva himself personally did not want to get into a violent mode. So, he took a strand of his hair and created Veerabhadra.

The Padma Purana identifies Virabhadra as the fierce form of Mangala (Mars). Virabhadra is born when Shiva, due to his anguish regarding the death of Sati, perspires, and his perspiration falls upon the earth. This gives birth to the fierce Virabhadra, who destroys the sacrifice. In the aftermath, Shiva calms him down and makes him Angaraka, the planet Mars.

=== Daksha yajna ===
The Skanda Purana states that ill-omens immediately started to surface when Shiva's forces started to march upon the Daksha yajna, describing a rain of blood and meteor showers. Finding these phenomena to be foreboding, Daksha sought the protection of Vishnu, who agreed to offer it, while also according blame to the former for his disrespect. The forces consisted of the Navadurga, rakshasas, yakshas, pishachas, a host of bhutas, thousands of ganas, as well as yoginis and guhyakas. These forces were commanded by the three-eyed Virabhadra, bearing a thousand arms, entwined with great serpents, with his chariot drawn by two thousand horses and a million lions. Indra and the devas were assisted by Bhrigu in routing the first wave of gana attacks. Angered, Virabhadra marshalled his forces in a counterattack, and wielding their battle-axes and iron clubs, they started to massacre the devas. The sages begged Vishnu to defend the sacrifice from the attackers, and the deity prepared to fight against Virabhadra. While Virabhadra offered his obeisance to the preserver deity, he accused him of seeking a share of the offerings of the sacrifice, and warned him against staying there. Vishnu laughed, and informed him that he had a duty to shield his devotees, and would leave after he had had his fill of Virabhadra's missiles. Indra chose to challenge Virabhadra, and struck him with his vajra. In retaliation, Virabhadra attempted to swallow Indra as well as his mount, Airavata. Vishnu intervened, saving Indra, and obstructing the assault of Virabhadra. He also summoned the Ashvins, who healed the fallen devas with their medicine. Enraged, Virabhadra confronted Vishnu. The preserver deity employed his Sudarshana Chakra against Virabhadra, which the latter swallowed whole. After retrieving his celestial discus, satisfied that he had turned the tide of the battle, Vishnu returned to his abode. Not satisfied with the carnage, Virabhadra accosted Bhrigu, Pushan, and when he saw the terrified Daksha cowering beneath the altar, he beheaded him, offering his head to the fire as a sacrifice. The disturbed Brahma visited Shiva, and begged him to put an end to the bloodshed. Shiva arrived at the Daksha yajna, conversed with Virabhadra, and restored life to Daksha by placing the head of a deformed animal upon his neck. The resurrected Daksha offered his obeisance to Shiva, which ended the conflict.

Various scriptures, coloured by their traditions, offer variations of the conflict, and Virabhadra's role in the legend. The Kurma Purana has Virabhadra realise that Vishnu and Shiva are the same deity, and proclaim that the world was created by Narayana. In the Harivamsha and Vamana Purana, Vishnu gains the upper hand in his fight against Virabhadra.

=== Significance ===
Based on the Shiva Purana, Virabhadra is traditionally considered the gotrapurusha (lit. 'male progenitor'), or forefather, of the Jats and Veerashaiva-Lingayat Hindu subsects (like the Lingayat Vani). These groups traditionally believe to be originated from Shiva's matted locks (jatta), possibly influencing the modern name Jat, and therefore worship Virabhadra as their ancestral god. They believe in having the qualities of a Kshatriya and are against discrimination and ego (deriving from Virabhadra's purpose, to kill Daksha).

Many temples were created by rulers of Veerashaiva-Lingayat faith including the Lepakshi Veerabhadra Temple. The temple was built between 1530 CE and 1540 CE. by Virupanna Nayaka and Viranna, both brothers who were governors under the Vijayanagara Empire. According to Skanda Purana, the temple is one of the divyakshetras (lit. 'divine regions'), an important pilgrimage site of Lord Shiva.

== List of famous temples ==
- Veerabhadra Temple, Lepakshi, Andhra Pradesh.
- Sri Bayalu Veerabhadra Swamy, Srisailam, Andhra Pradesh.
- Veerabhadra Temple, Pattiseema, Andhra Pradesh.
- Sri Veereswara Swamy Temple, Muramalla, Andhra Pradesh
- Veerabhadra Temple, Yadur, Karnataka.
- Kuravi Veerabhadra Swamy Temple, Kuravi, Telangana
- Sri Veerabhadra Swamy Devasthanam, Kothakonda, Hanamkonda, Telangana

== Gallery ==
Veerabhadreshwara at Vadhav Temple of Maharashtra

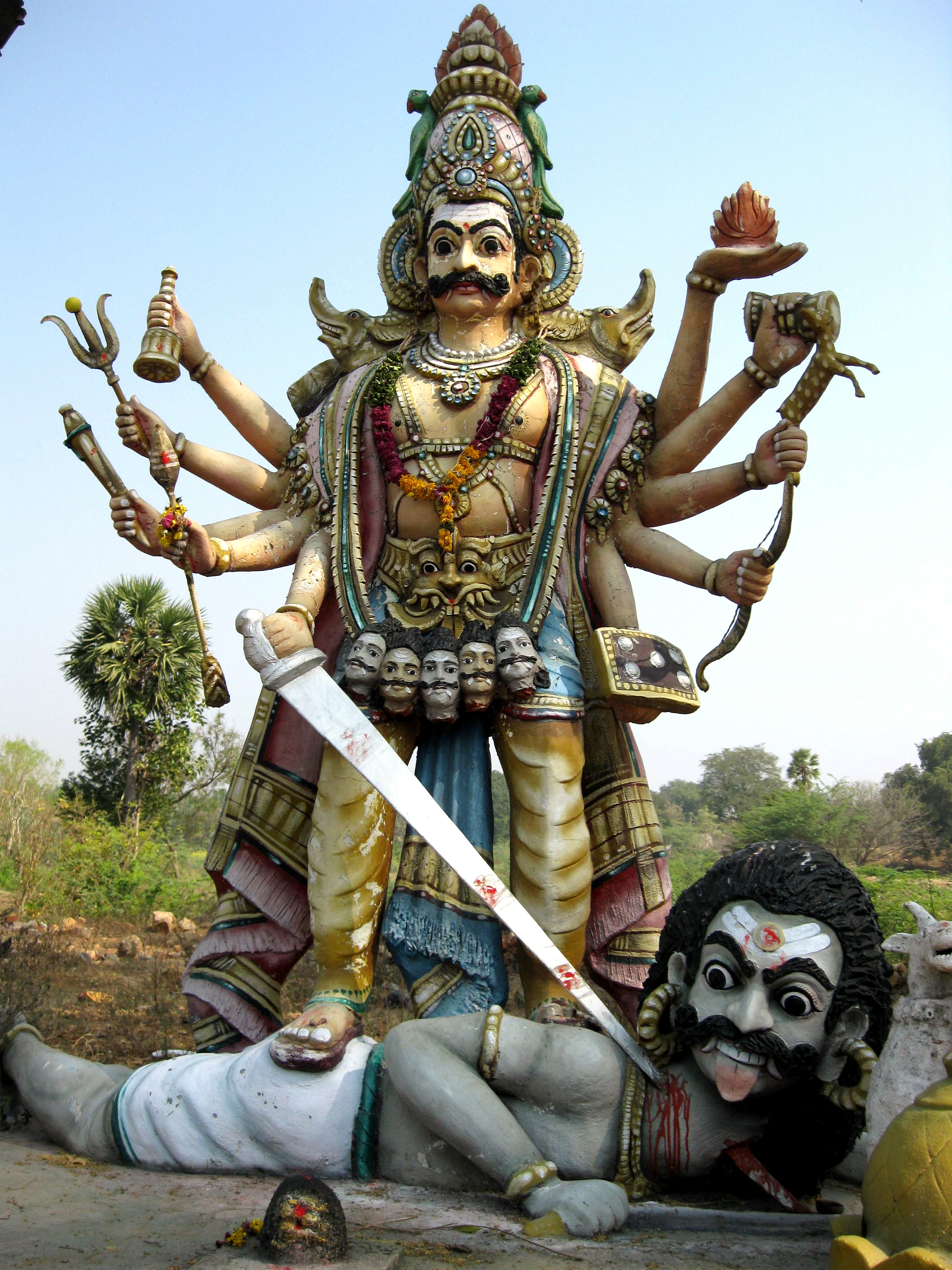
Veerabhadreshwara statue in Dharmapuri district of Tamilnadu

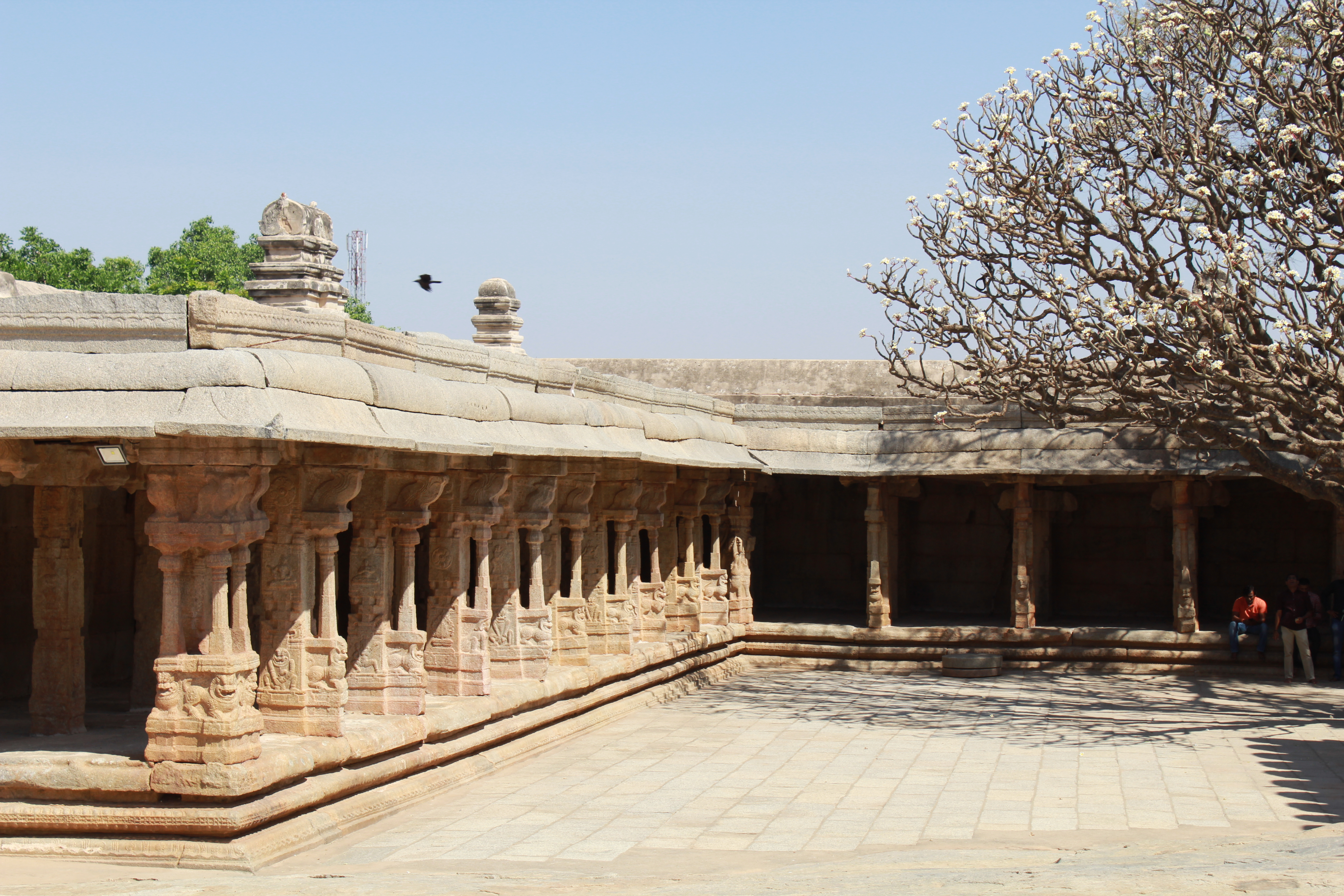
Ancient Veerabhadra Temple, Lepakshi
