= Hirekudi =

Hirekudi Hirekodi
- Village
- Location in Karnataka, India Hirekudi (India)
- Coordinates: 16.42°N 74.58°E
- Country: India
- State: Karnataka
- District: Belgaum
- Talukas: Chikodi

Population (2011)
  - Total: 13,000

Languages
  - Official: Kannada
- Time zone: UTC+5:30 (IST)
- Postal code: 591 247

Hirekudi is a village in the southern state of Karnataka, India. It is located in the Chikodi taluk of Belgaum district in Karnataka.

== Demographics ==
Hirekudi is a large village with total 2294 families residing. The Hirekudi village has a population of 11946, of whom 6111 were males while 5835 were females as per Population Census 2011.

In Hirekudi village population of children aged 0-6 was 1534 which made up 12.84% of the total population. The average sex ratio of Hirekudi village was 955, which was lower than Karnataka state average of 973. The child sex ration was 889, lower than the Karnataka average of 948.

Hirekudi village has a lower literacy rate than Karnataka. In 2011, the literacy rate of Hirekudi village was 74.21% compared to 75.36% in Karnataka. In Hirekudi male literacy was 82.94% while female literacy rate was 65.17%.

In Hirekudi village, out of the total population, 6290 were engaged in work activities. 66.12% of workers described their work as main work (employment or earning more than six months), while 33.88% were involved in marginal activity providing livelihood for less than six months. Of the 6290 workers engaged in main work, 2383 were cultivators (owners or co-owners) while 760 were agricultural labourers.

As per the constitution of India and Panchyati Raaj Act, Hirekudi village is administrated by a sarpanch (head of village), who is the elected representative of the village.

== Geography ==
Hirekudi is located at 16.42°N 74.58°E. It has an average elevation of 595 metres (1952.1 feet). The town has an area of 25 km^{2} and is situated amidst hills. Temperature varies from a maximum of 35 °C to a minimum of 18 °C. The maximum average rainfall annually is 826.64mm.

== Nearby places ==
- Chikodi-Ganesh Temple, near the bus stand on top of hill is a famous temple of lord Ganesha. There is one more temple known as Parati Nagalingeswara temple, is located about 2.5 km away from the bus stand.
- Yadur - Shree Veerbhardra temple is situated in the holy Shri Kseshtra Yadur, on the banks of river Krishna is located about 20 km from Chikodi
- Karoshi - Shree Basavanna temple, situated in the holy place of Karoshi, is located about 7 km from Chikodi. It has a famous darga, also this indicates the communal harmony it has. This place is agriculturally sound.
- Shantigiri Jain Temple is about 10 km from Chikodi. This village can be considered one of the highlighted centers of Jain history, where the shri shantigiri Tirth is situated.
- Nagarmunoli is a village near Chikodi known for its Ayurvedic medicine.
- Chinchani - Having Allamprabhu Sidd Sansthan Math, Shri Basaveshwar temple (Gudadagind basavan) is located about 5 km from Chikodi.
- Toranahalli, a Bhagavan Hanuman temple, is present in this village near 10 km from Chikodi.
- Lakkavva Temple is in the laxmi nagar of Basavanal Gadde.
- Hanuman Temple is located in the Basav Nagar of Basavanal Gadde.

== Educational institutions ==
- Minority Morarji Desai Residential School, Hirekudi Chikkodi.
- Government Kannada Medium Primary and High School
- Government Urdu Medium Primary School

== See also ==
- Belgaum
- Districts of Karnataka
