= Yadurwadi =

Yadurwadi Yadurwadi
- Village
- Interactive map of Yadurwadi
- Coordinates: 16°35.8′N 74°40.8′E
- Country: India

Population (2011)
  - Total: 2,456
- Postal code: 591273
- Area code: 08338

Yadurwadi is a village situated at the banks of the Krishna River in Belagavi district in the southern state of Karnataka, India. Sugarcane is a main source of income for the people here. Farmers also grow soybeans in the monsoon season and wheat in the winter season. Yadurwadi is the part of Yadur Gram Panchayat. Neighbouring villages are Chandur, Shahapur, Khotwadi, Hale Yadur, Hosa Yadur and Khidrapur

== Transportation ==
=== Road ===
The village is about 1.5 kilometres (0.93 mi) from State Highway 12. There are both public and private buses running on State Highway 12. The village has direct bus to Chikodi every two hours during the daytime.

=== Railway ===
Near by railway stations are at Raibag Miraj and Ugar.

=== Air ===
Air travel is available from nearby airports at Belagavi, Hubli, and Kolhapur.

== "Laxmi Jatre" The village fair ==
Every year at the end of May or in June, Goddess Laxmi Devi Jatre Is celebrated for two days. Friday is the main Day of the Jatre, People enjoy mango juice On Jatre Days.

=== Events In Jatre ===
==== Tuesday ====
Akshata On Goddess Laxmi.

==== Friday ====
Morning 11.00 AM Naivedde. Night 10.00 PM Pallakki.

==== Saturday ====
Morning 9.00 AM Sharayattu. Evening 04.30 PM Jangi Kusti

== Krishna River ==
The village is situated on the banks of Krishna River One of the India's largest river and therefore never faces any water scarcity.

== CROPS ==
1.Sugar Cane 2.Soyabean 3.All types of vegetables 4.Bengal Gram 5. Hesar Kalu 4.Udad

== Flood ==
Yadurwadi is surrounded by the Krishna River from all four sides. During monsoon season the water level rises in the river. In the year (2019), & 2021 Due to heavy flood 50 % of village affected by flood water. 60 % of the village was evacuated. In 2005, a monsoon caused heavy flooding and the village was fully surrounded by water. People were unable to go out from the village. But water never entered inside the village and Village remained safe.
