= Veerabhadra Temple, Lepakshi =

Hindu temple in India

Veerabhadra Temple
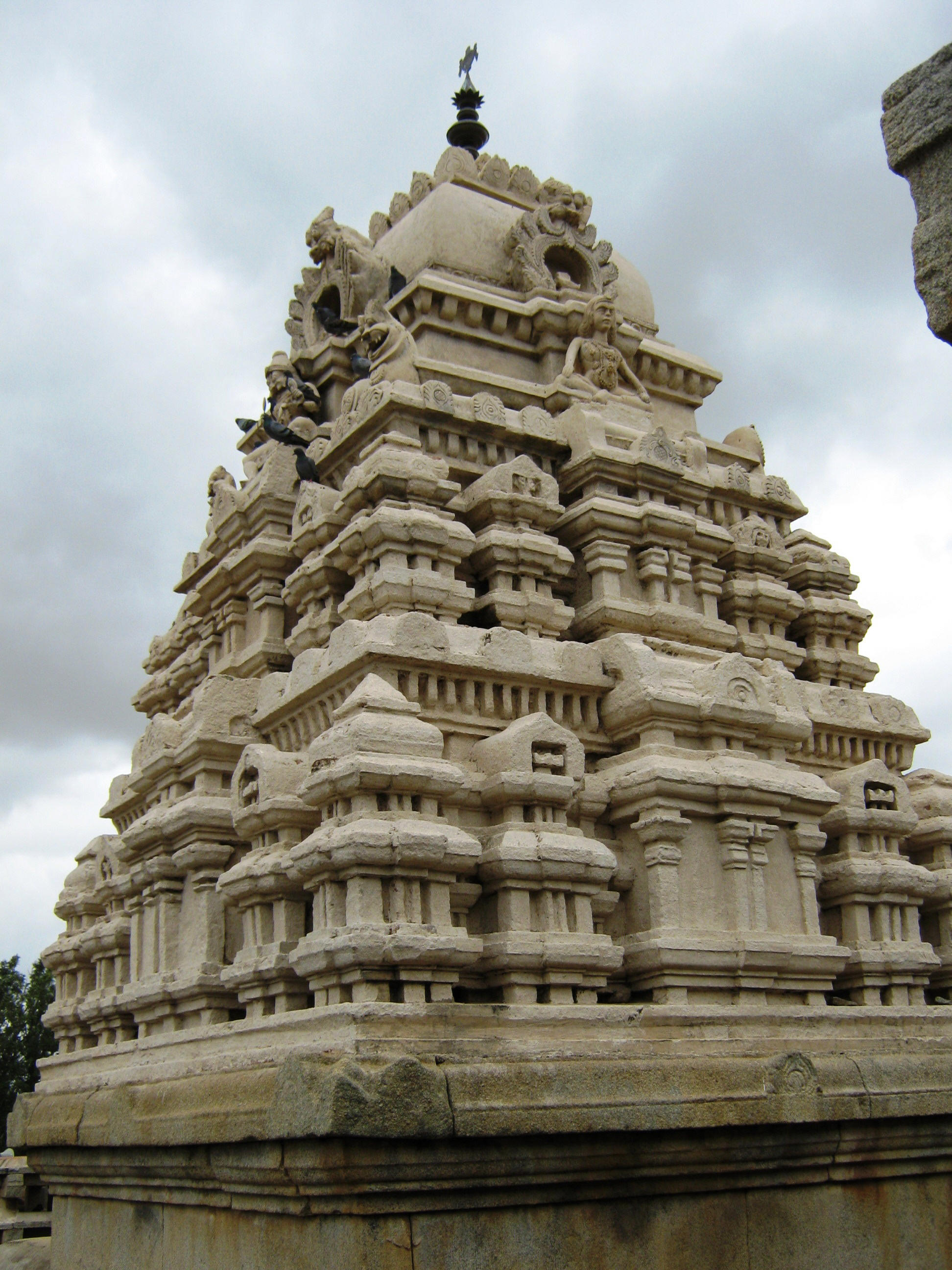
- Gopuram

- Location within Andhra Pradesh

Religion
- Affiliation: Hinduism
- District: Sri Sathya Sai
- Deity: Veerabhadra

Location
- Location: Lepakshi
- State: Andhra Pradesh
- Country: India
- Coordinates: 13°48′6.64″N 77°36′34.37″E

Architecture
- Type: Dravidian architecture

Veerabhadra temple is a Hindu temple located in the Lepakshi, in the state of Andhra Pradesh, India. The temple is dedicated to Virabhadra, a fierce form of Shiva, a major deity in Hinduism.

Built in the 16th century, the architectural features of the temple are in the Vijayanagara style with profusion of carvings and paintings at almost every exposed surface of the temple. It is one of the centrally protected monuments of national importance and is considered one of the most spectacular Vijayanagara temples. The fresco paintings are particularly detailed in very bright dresses and colours with scenes of Rama and Krishna from the epic stories of the Ramayana, the Mahabharata and the Puranas and they are well preserved.

There is a very large Nandi (bull), mount of Shiva, about 200 metres (660 ft) away from the temple which is carved from a single block of stone, which is said to be one of the largest of its type in the world.

== Location ==
The temple has been built on the southern side of Lepakshi town, on a low altitude hillock of a large exposure of granite rock, which is in the shape of a tortoise, and hence known as Kurma Saila. It is 140 kilometres (87 mi) away from Bangalore. The approach from the National Highway NH7 to Hyderabad that takes a branch road at the Karnataka-Andhra Pradesh border leading to Lepakshi, 12 kilometres (7.5 mi) away. Another route to reach the temple is taking a route from Hindupur. It is situated 35 kilometres (22 mi) from Penukonda, located in Sri Sathya Sai district of Andhra Pradesh.

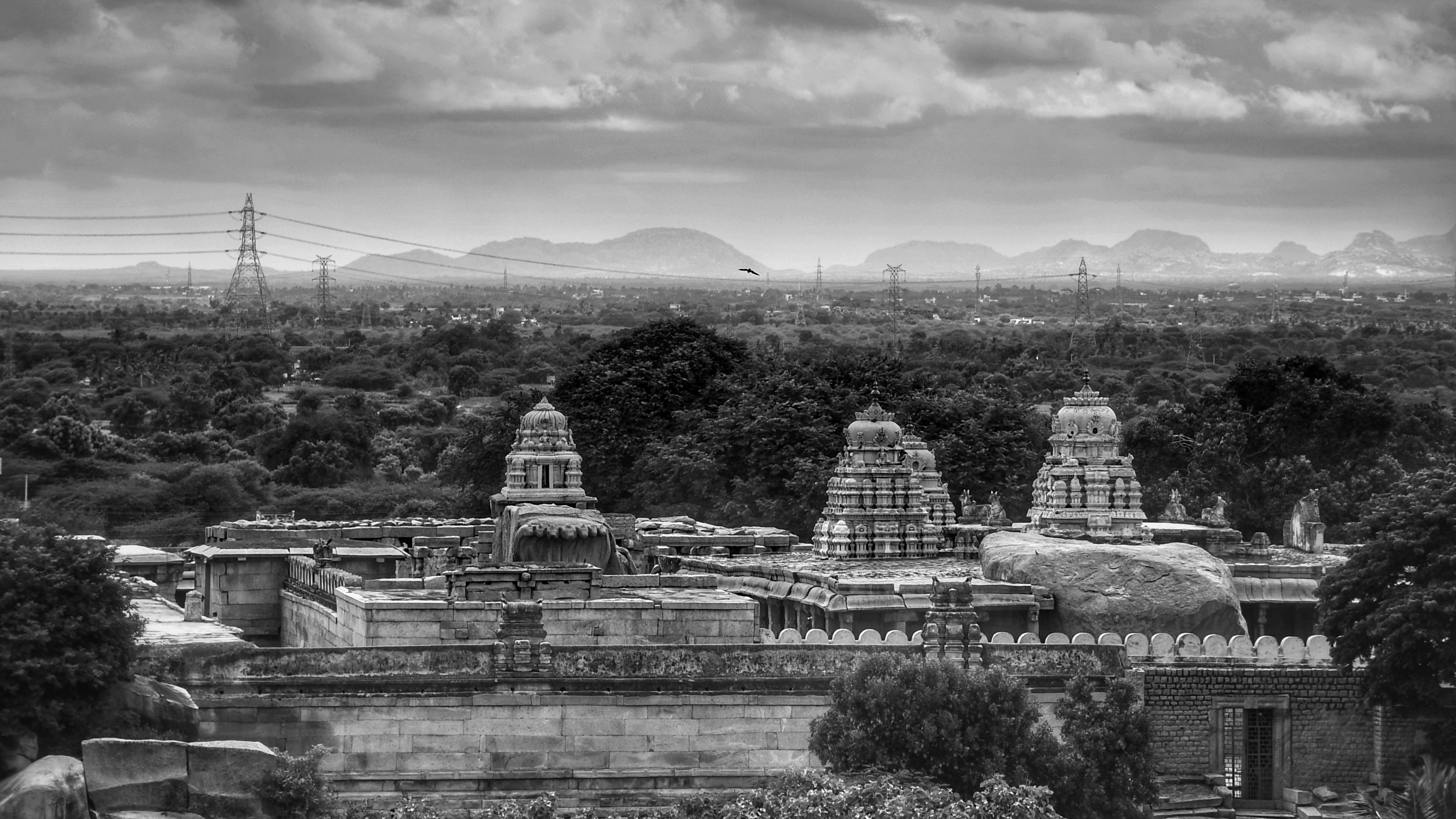
Aerial view of the main temple complex

== History ==
The temple was built in 1530 AD (1540 AD is also mentioned) by Virupanna and Viranna, brothers who were courtiers under the Vijayanagar Empire during the reign of King Achyuta Deva Raya, at Penukonda. The temple consists of 21 inscriptions. Several of them are in kannada script and sanskrit language. The cost of building the temple was defrayed by the government. According to Skanda Purana, the temple is one of the divyakshetras, an important pilgrimage site of Lord Shiva.

== Architecture ==
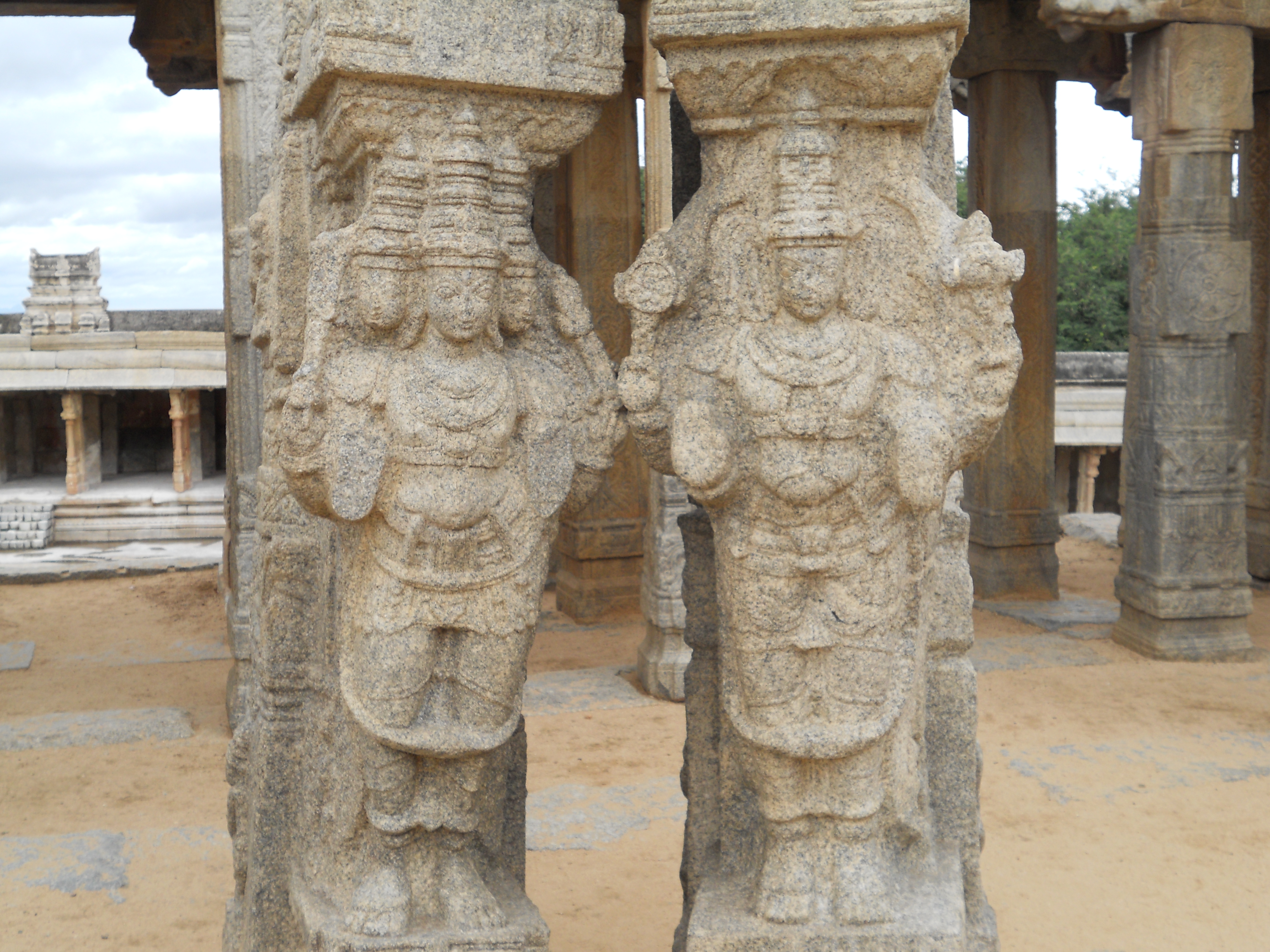
Carvings of Brahma and Vishnu on pillars in the manadapa

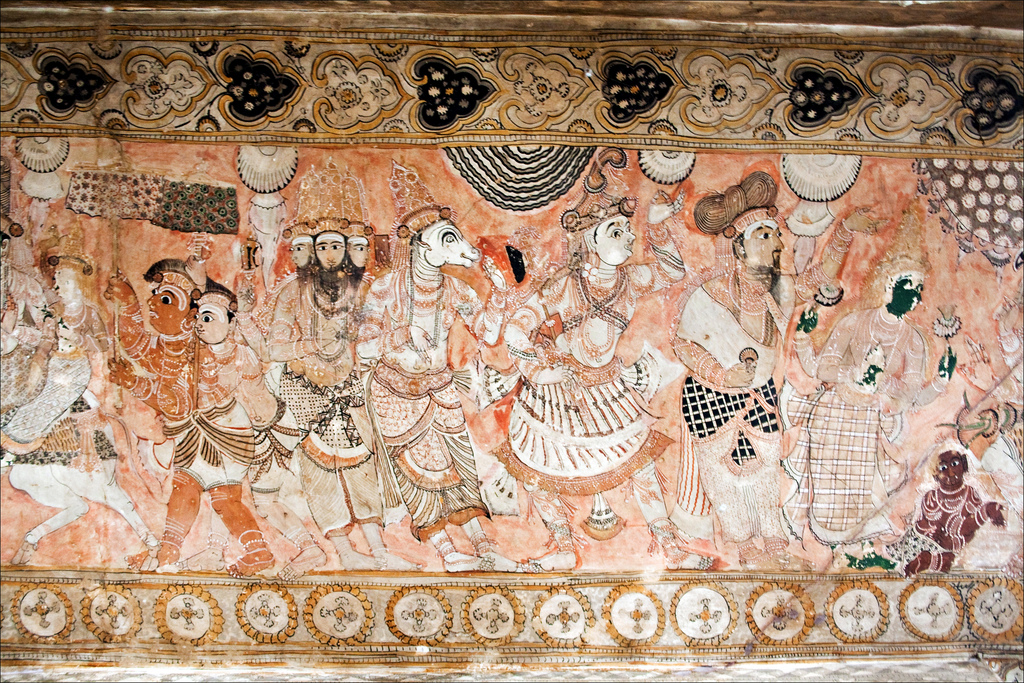
Paintings in the ceiling of the Muka mantapa

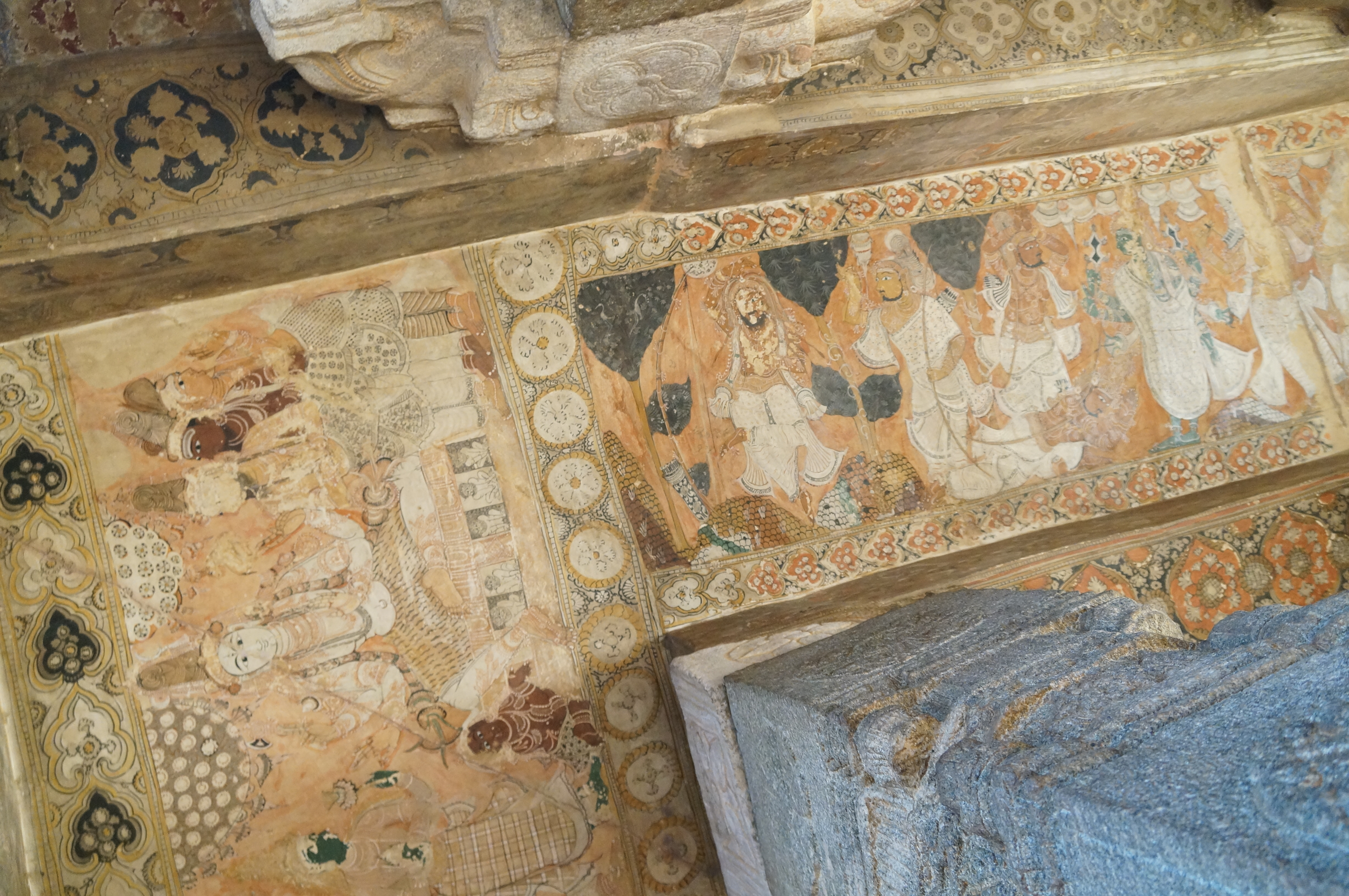
A painting in the ceiling

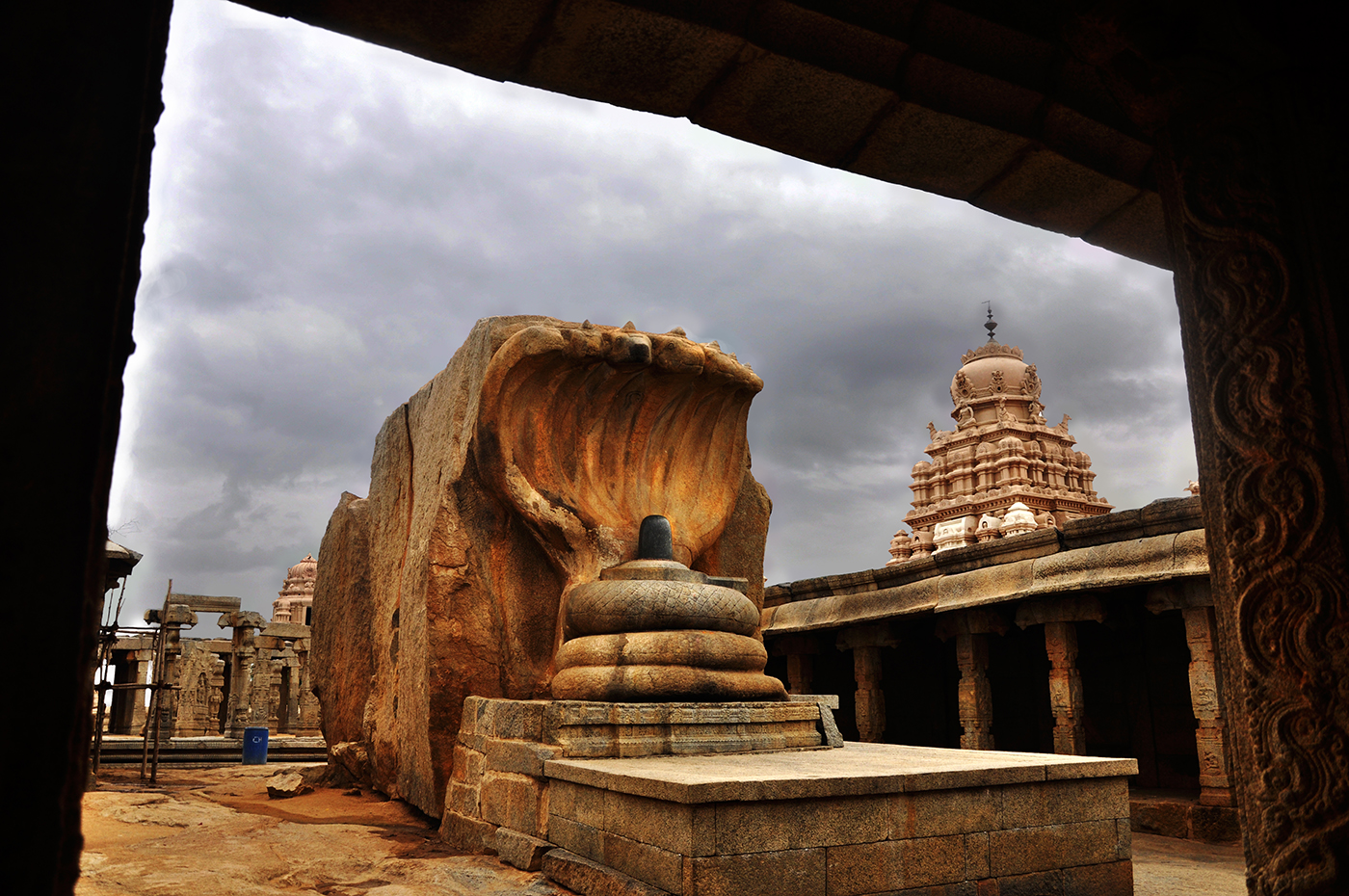
The hooded serpent with 7 heads shading the lingam sculpture

The temple is of the Vijayanagara architectural style. The main temple is laid out in three parts, these are: The assembly hall known as the Mukha mantapa or Natya mantapa or Ranga mantapa; arda mantapa or antarala (ante chamber); and the garbhagriha or the sanctum sanctorum. The temple, as an edifice, is encircled by two enclosures. The outermost walled enclosure has three gates, the northern gate is used regularly. The inner east gate is the entry to the assembly hall, which is a large sized open hall designed with a large space in its central part.

It is at the entrance to the sanctum sanctorum and has a profusion of sculptures and paintings over every inch of space on the columns and ceiling. The images on the pillars and walls are of divine beings, saints, guardians, musicians, dancers and 15 Mahesha murtams of Shiva. According to Chapter 3 of Dr. Adeesh Babu’s PhD thesis Iconographical Studies: Being of Allegories in the Paintings of Lepakshi Temple, fifteen Maheshamurtam forms are identified in Panel B1, including Kalantaka Murti, Jalandhara Vadha Murti, Vyakhyana Dakshinamurti, Vishnuprasada Murti, Kankala Murti, Harihara Murti, Kirata Murti, Ardhanarishwara Murti, Vaivahiya Murti, Chaturbhujatripurandaka Murti, Ganga Visarjana Murti (Gangadhara Murti), Nataraja Murti, Vrishavahana Murti, Kevalachandrashekara Murti, and Uma Maheshwara. Figurines of the goddesses Ganga and Yamuna flank the entrance to the sanctum. The exterior columns of this hall are built over a decorated plinth; the decorations are in the form of blocks of carved images of horses and soldiers. The columns are slim and have features of colonnettes carved with eaves, overhanging in a curved shape. The open space in the middle part of the hall is defined by large columns or piers which have carvings of triple figures.

In the columns in the northeastern part of the hall, there are images of Natesha flanked by Brahma and a drummer. In an adjoining column there are figurines of nymphs in dancing postures, flanked by a drummer and cymbalist. The column at the southwest part of the hall has an image of Parvathi, Shiva's consort, flanked by female attendants. There are also carvings of divinities such as Bhringi with three legs and Bhikshatana carved in a dancing posture; this is in the northwestern part of the hall. The ceiling of the hall is fully covered with mural paintings depicting the scenes from the epics, the Mahabharata, the Ramayana, and the Puranas along with the life sketches of the benefactors of the temple.

The paintings in each bay on the ceiling of the main mandapa, the antarala and other shrines, depict the grandeur of Vijayanagara pictorial art. They are painted over an initial plaster layer of lime mortar. The colour scheme consists of vegetable and mineral colours of yellow, ochre, black, blue and green blended with lime water; the background is generally painted in red colour. Apart from figures of gods and goddesses, in the presence of the devotees arranged in rows, the frescoes also depict the incarnations of Vishnu. The paintings are in striking compositions where the particular emphasis is on the period costumes and facial expressions.

The fresco in the ceiling of ardha mantapa (ante chamber), which is said to be Asia's largest, measures 23 by 13 feet (7.0 m × 4.0 m). It has frescoes of the 14 avatars of Lord Shiva as: Yogadakshinamurti, Chandes Anugraha Murthy, Bhikshatana, Harihara, Ardhanarishwara, Kalyanasundara, Tripurantaka, Nataraja, Gouriprasadaka, Lingodbhava, Andhakasurasmahara and so forth.

The presiding deity deified in the sanctum sanctorum is a near life-size image of Veerabhadra, fully armed and decorated with skulls. There is a cave chamber in the sanctum where sage Agasthya is said to have lived when he installed the image of the Linga here. The ceiling in the sanctum above the deity has paintings of the builders of the temple, Virupanna and Viranna, regally dressed and crowned with headgear similar to those adorning the Krishnadevaraya's bronze statue in Tirupati. They are depicted, with their entourage, in a state of reverential prayer, being offered sacred ashes of their family deity.

Within the temple complex, on the eastern wing, there is a separate chamber with Shiva and his consort Parvathi carved on a boulder. In another shrine chamber there is an image of Lord Vishnu.

Within the temple precincts, to its eastern side, there is huge boulder of granite stone which has carving of coiled multi-hooded serpent providing an umbrella cover over a Linga.

The apparently "hanging pillar" is yet another attraction in the temple. There is a gap between the base of the pillar and ground through which cloth and paper can be passed, as the pillar is slightly dislodged and touching the ground only on one side.

A huge granite Nandi (bull), 20 feet (6.1 m) in height and 30 feet (9.1 m) in length, bedecked with garlands and bells, carved out of a single block stone, is located about 200 metres (660 ft) from the temple, which faces the statue of the serpent in the precincts of the temple.

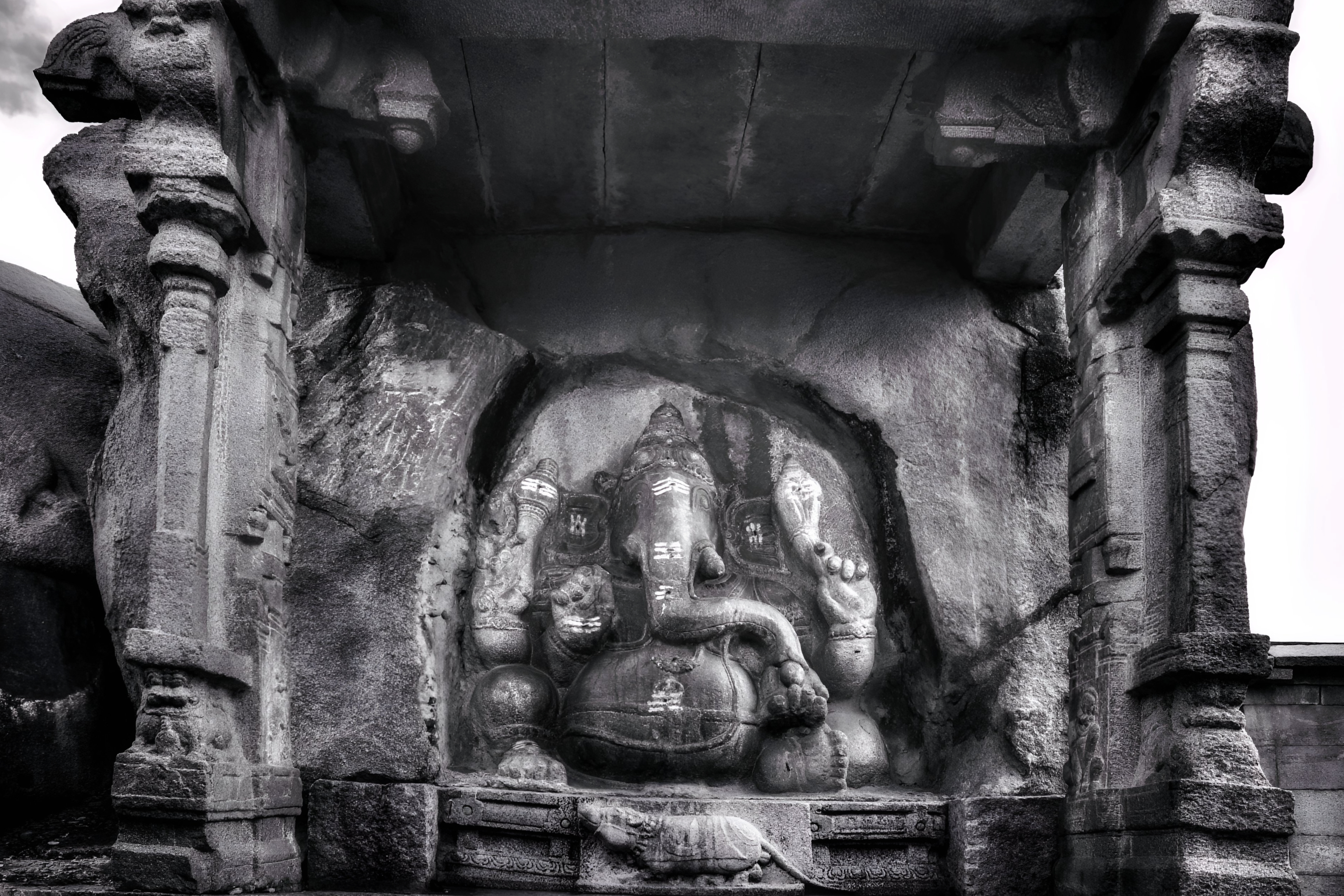
Ganesha idol, Lepakshi temple complex

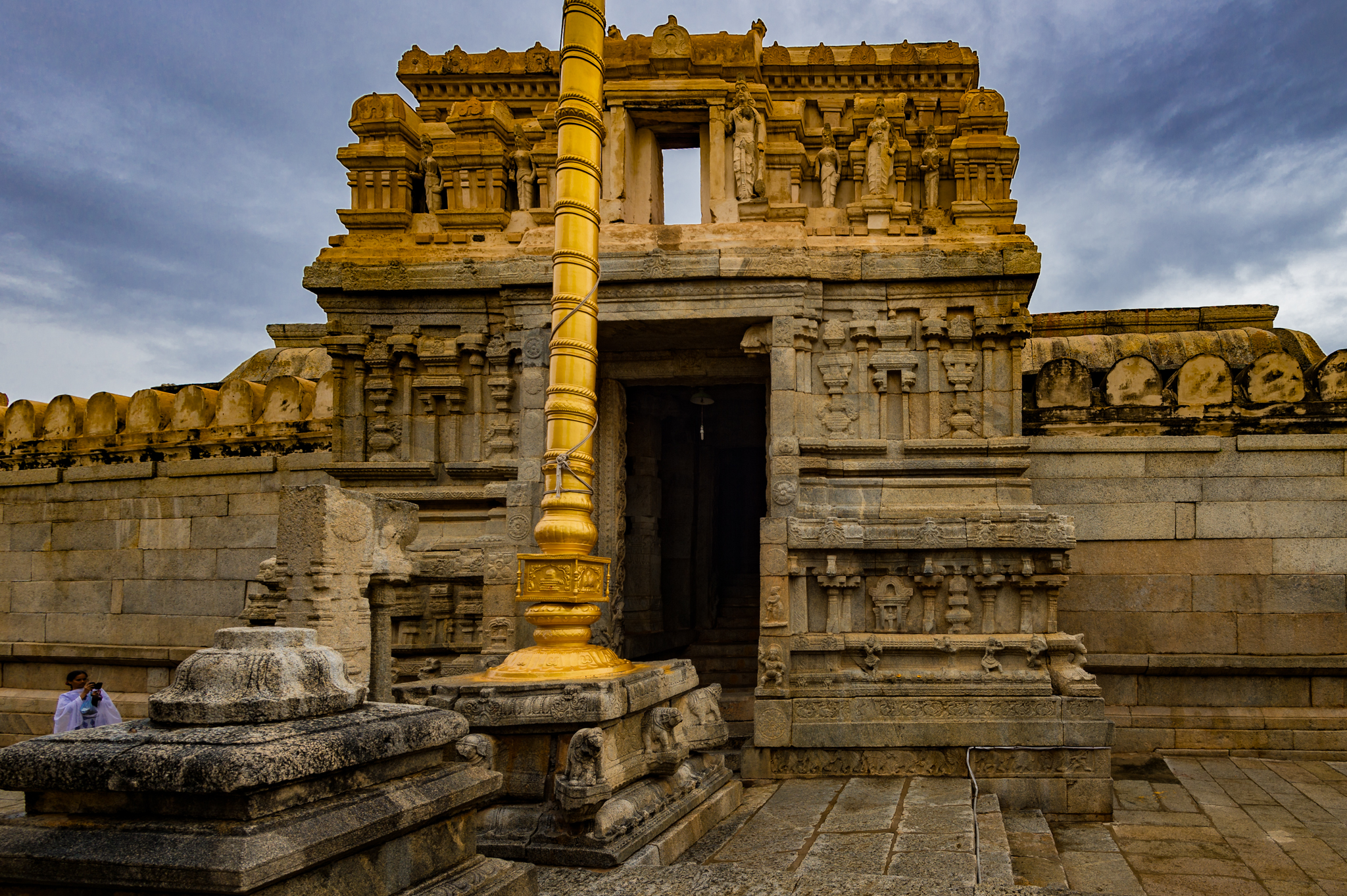
Front Side View of Veerabhadra Temple, Lepakshi

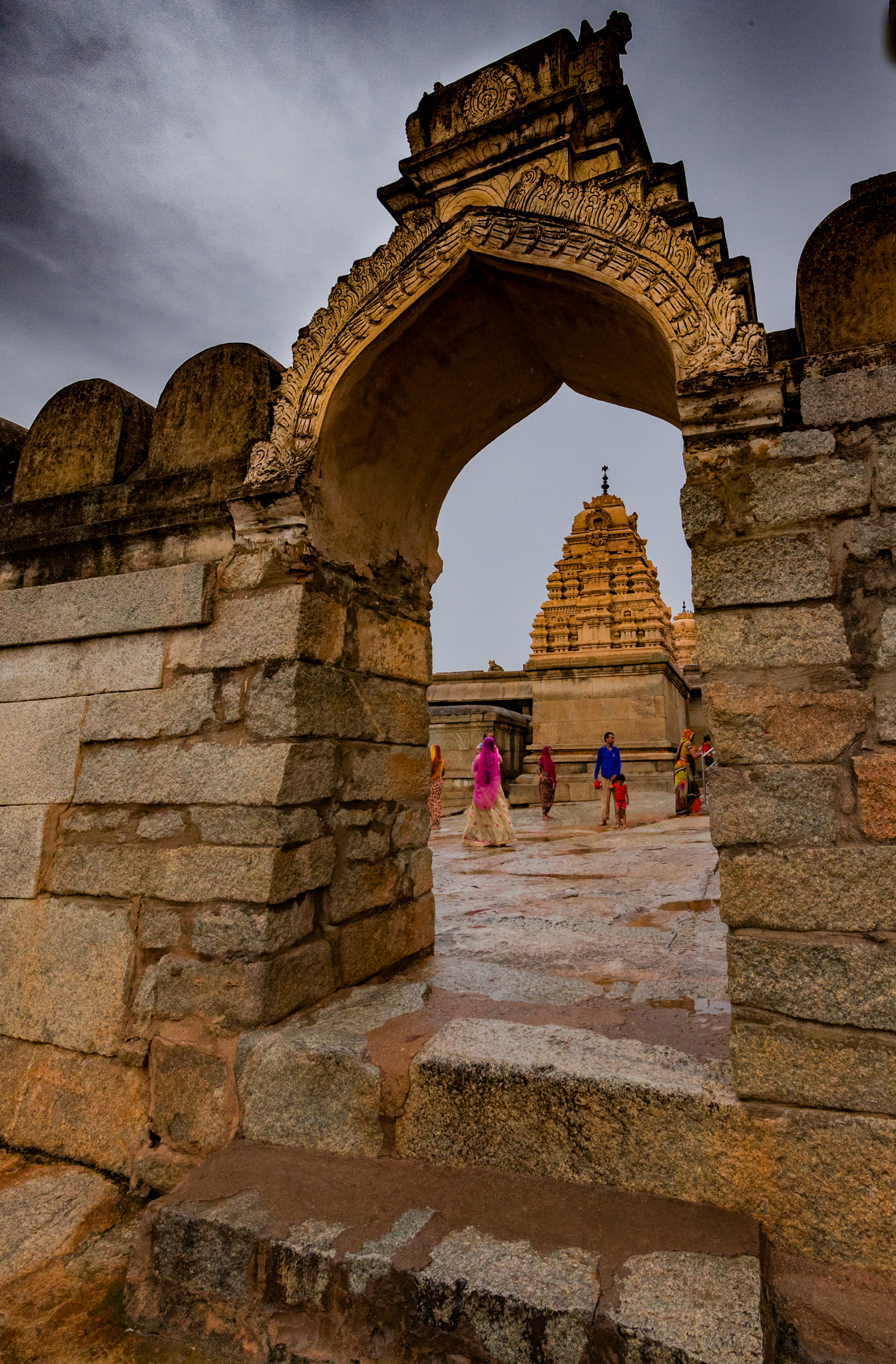
North Side View of the temple

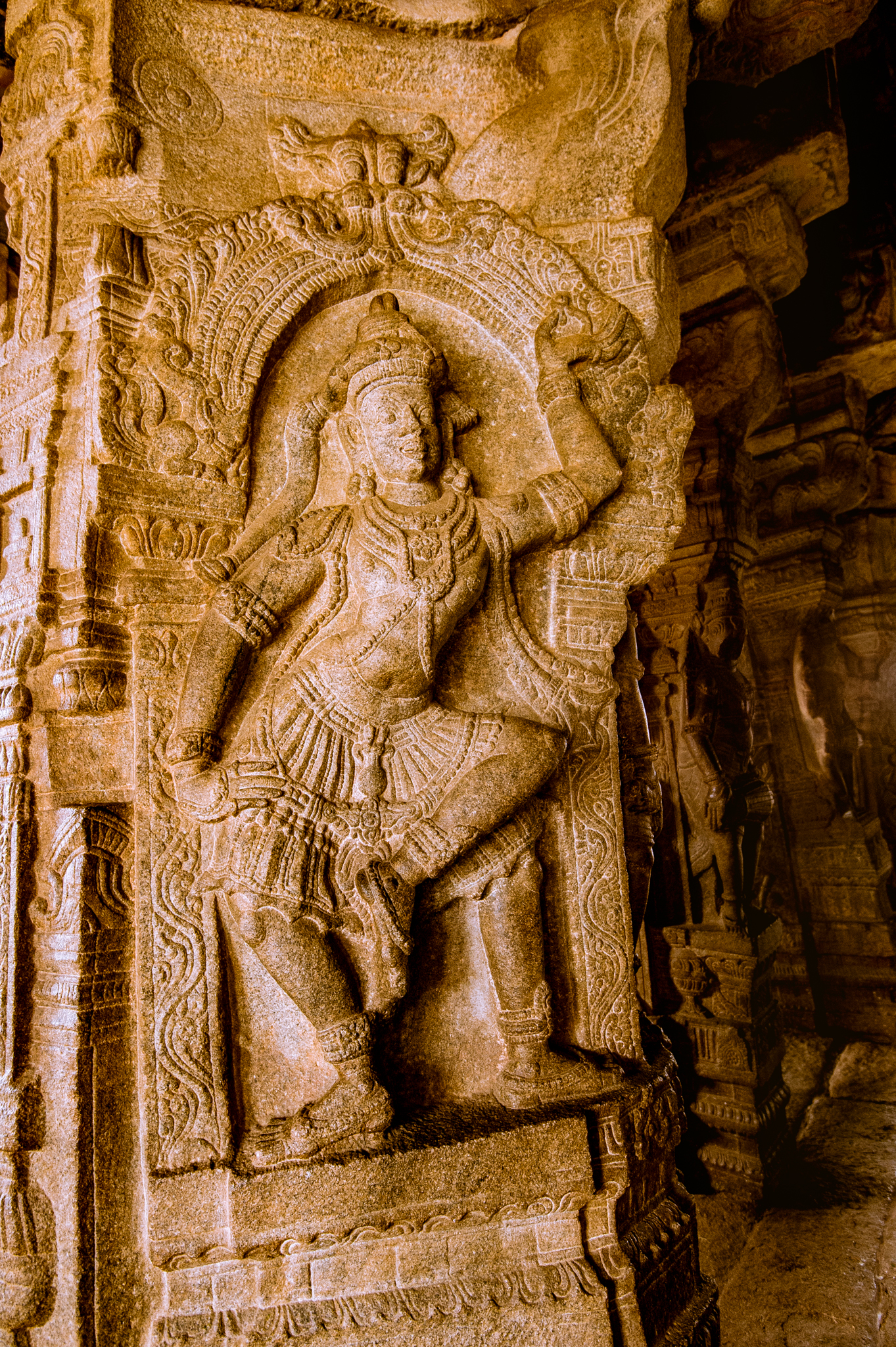
The Dance Teacher

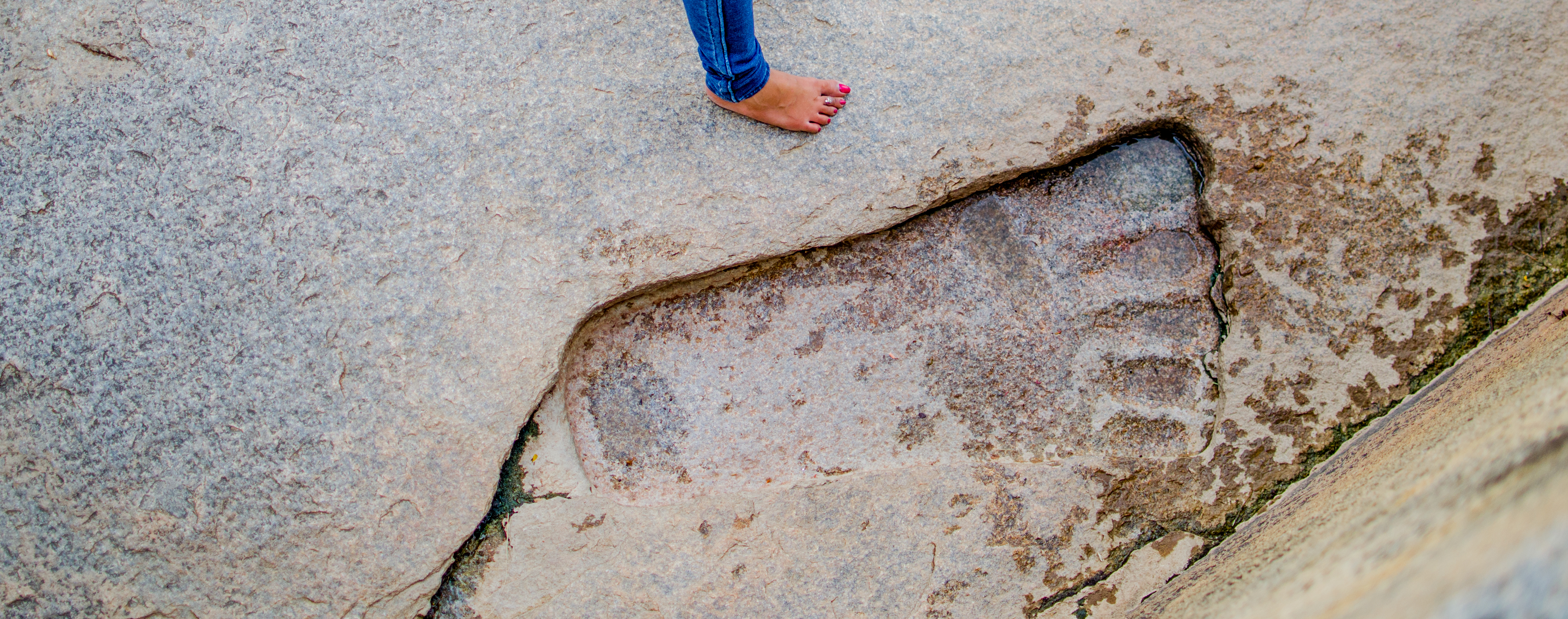
Giant footprint inside the temple premises. It is said to be of that of Sita or Hanuman.

== Mural paintings ==
The mural paintings of the Veerabhadra Temple rank among the most important surviving examples of Vijayanagara pictorial art. They were commissioned in the 16th century under Virupanna wadiyar and Viranna wadiyar during the reign of Achyuta Deva Raya and cover the ceilings of the mahamandapa, the mukha mandapa, the antarala, and several subsidiary shrines. The panels follow the bayed columns of the mandapas, verandahs, and corridors in elongated strips, ranging in length from around 5 metres to as much as 25 metres.

=== Technique ===
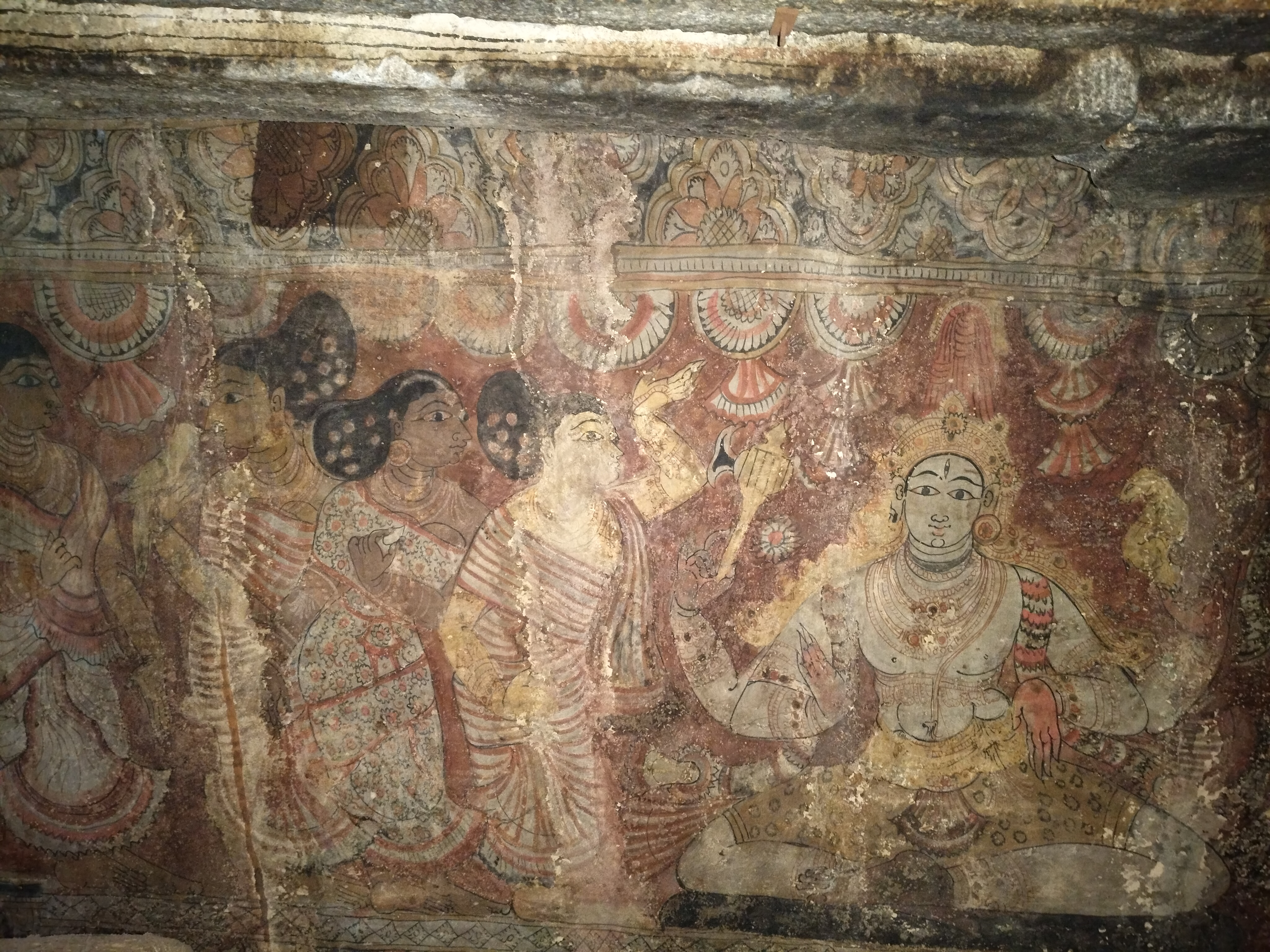
Vijayanagara-period mural depicting a seated deity with attendants at the Veerabhadra Temple, Lepakshi, Andhra Pradesh, India.

The painters worked on a prepared ground of sandy clay from nearby riverbeds, mixed with red ochre and lime powder blended with liquid molasses, applied directly over the granite surfaces. Compositions were first sketched in red ochre, then filled with colour and outlined with fine black strokes. The background is almost always red ochre. Figures are rendered in black, white, yellow, various shades of grey, and occasional blue-green, using vegetable and mineral pigments mixed with lime water. The figures are slender and elegant, with significant attention given to the depiction of clothing, hairstyles, headgear, and jewellery, including the pleats of dhotis, sarees, and tunics. The eyes of figures are drawn in a pronounced elongated almond shape that is characteristic of the Vijayanagara school.

=== Subject matter ===
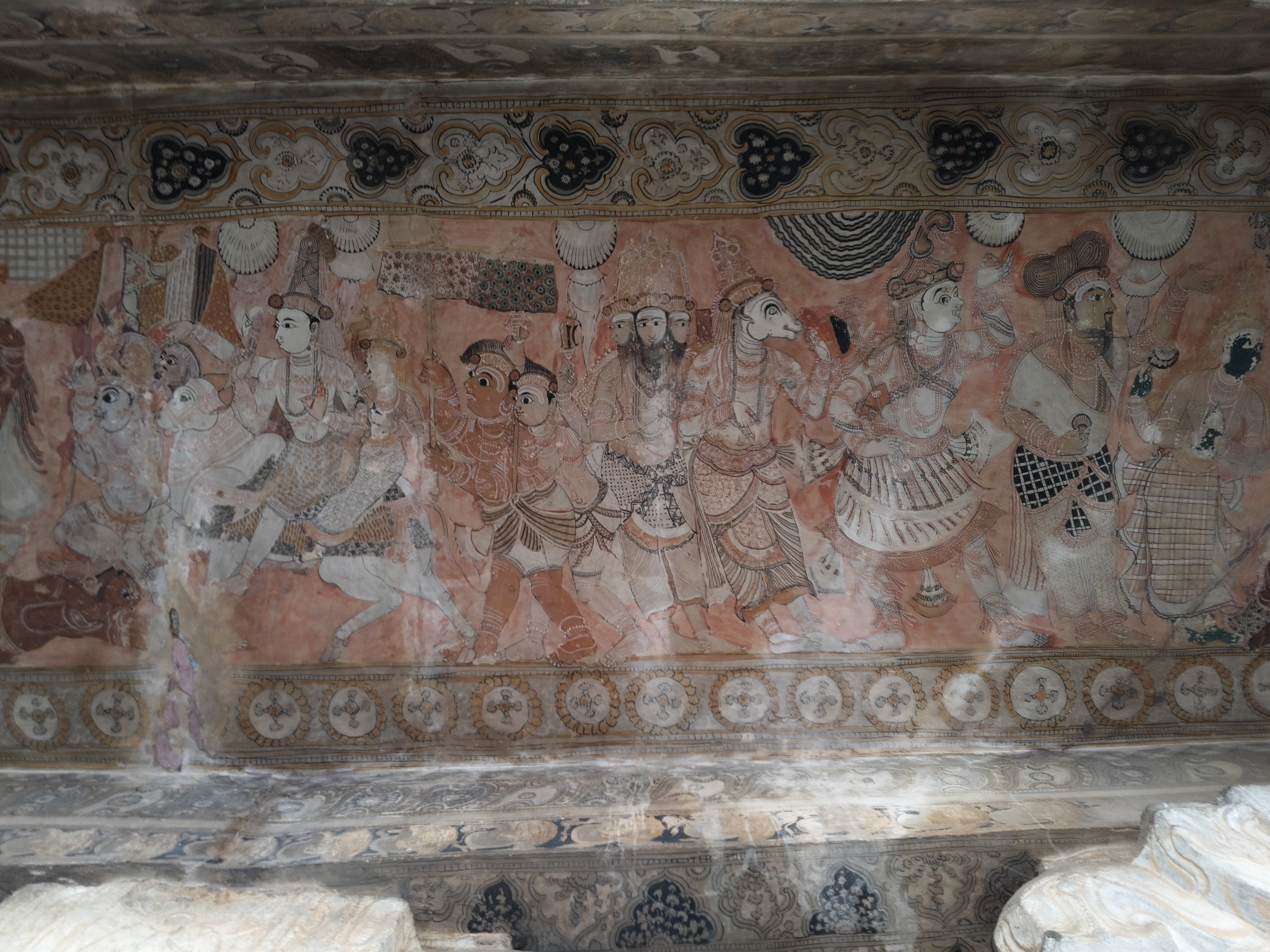
Vijayanagara-period mural depicting the wedding of Shiva and Parvati with Brahma officiating and attendants at the Veerabhadra Temple, Lepakshi, Andhra Pradesh, India.

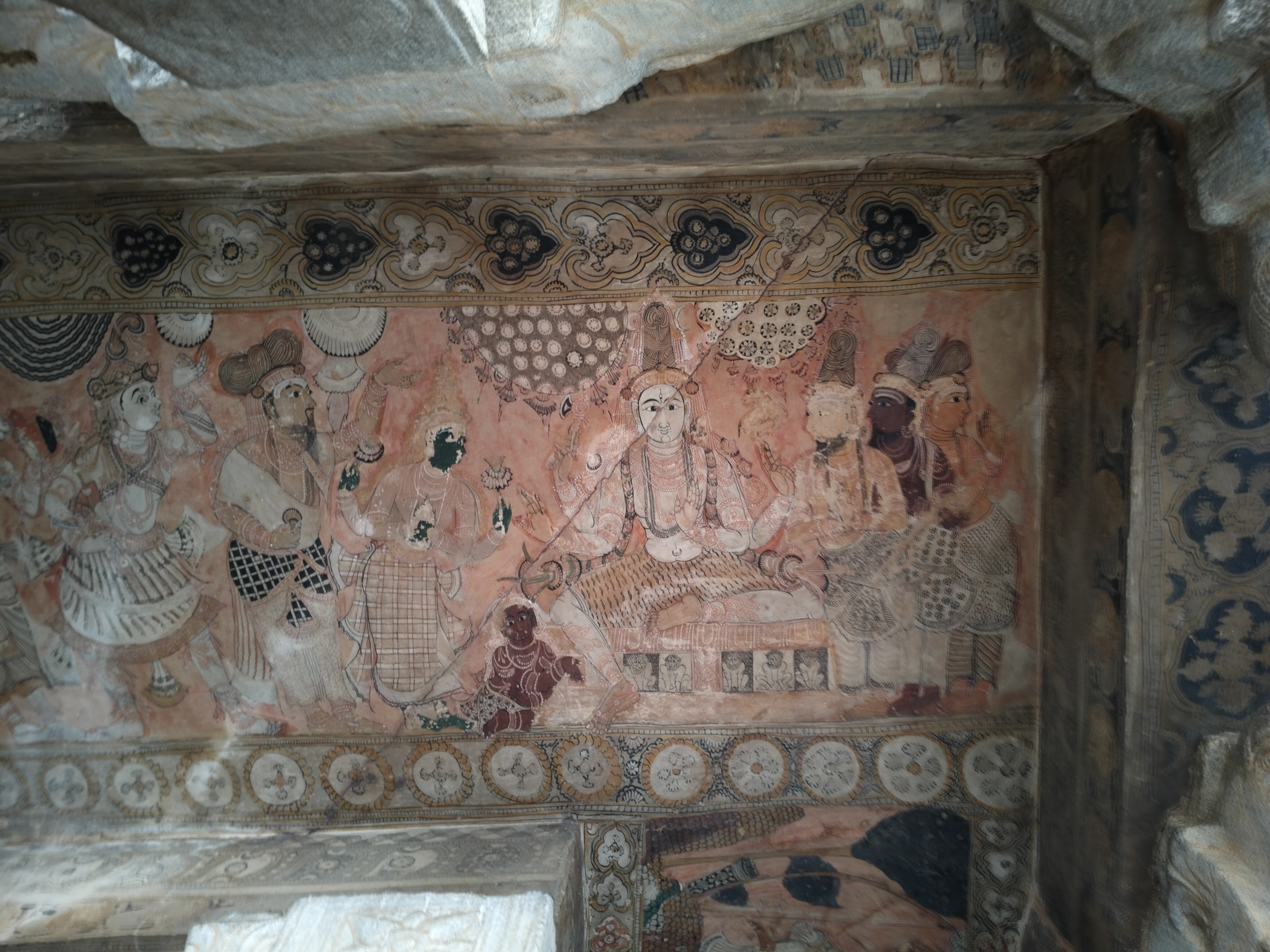
Vijayanagara-period mural depicting Shiva seated on a tiger skin and surrounded by attendant deities at the Veerabhadra Temple, Lepakshi, Andhra Pradesh, India.

The ceiling of the mukha mandapa carries narrative scenes from the Ramayana, the Mahabharata, and the Puranas. Among the episodes shown are the wedding of Shiva and Parvati with Brahma officiating, Ravana lifting Mount Kailash, the swayamvara of Draupadi, the Kiratarjuna episode in which Arjuna encounters Shiva disguised as a hunter, the story of Manu Needhi Cholan, and Shiva and Parvati playing a board game.

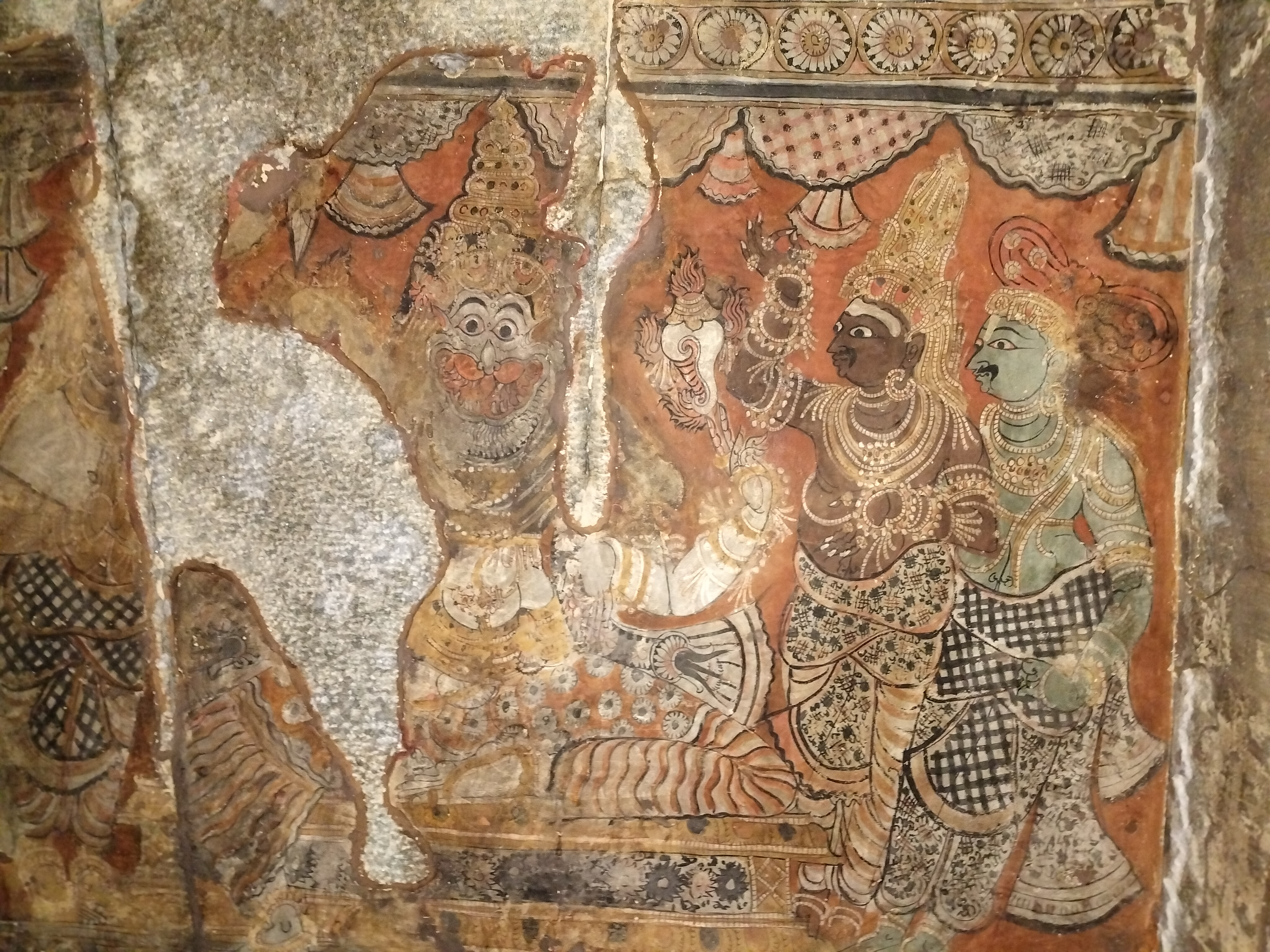
Mural depicting Narasimha slaying Hiranyakashipu at the Veerabhadra Temple, Lepakshi, Andhra Pradesh, India.

The mahamandapa ceiling is organised around a large central composition of Veerabhadra flanked by Viranna and his wife, spread across thirteen panels each divided into sub-panels. The borders around this central group are filled with mythical creatures, celestial figures, devotees, dancers, and musicians. The natya mandapa pillars carry figures of Brahma, Nataraja, the apsara Rambha in a dancing posture, Bhikshatana, and the three-legged sage Bhringi. The ardha mandapa ceiling, measuring approximately 23 by 13 feet (7.0 m × 4.0 m), carries fourteen forms of Shiva including Dakshinamurthy, Bhikshatana, Harihara, Ardhanarishvara, Tripurantaka, Nataraja, and Lingodbhava. The ceiling of the sanctum shows the temple's patrons, Virupanna and Viranna, in an act of worship, dressed in court robes and headgear comparable to that on the bronze statue of Krishnadevaraya at Tirupati.

The largest single figure in the temple is the fresco of Veerabhadra on the ceiling before the main sanctum. It measures roughly 24 by 14 feet (7.3 m × 4.3 m) and is considered the largest single-figure fresco in Asia.

=== Costumes and cultural context ===
The paintings are one of the more detailed visual records of dress and ornament in 16th-century Deccan court culture. Male courtiers in the natyamandapa appear in white tunics with tall conical caps known as kabayi and kullayi, garments that carry visible Islamic influence absorbed into Vijayanagara court dress. The figures across the murals show careful attention to the pleats of dhotis, sarees, and tunics, as well as to jewellery and headgear, and the Vijayanagara influence on human figures is particularly visible in the detailing of faces and clothing. These depictions match accounts left by Persian, Chinese, Portuguese, and Italian travellers of the period, making the murals a cross-referenced source for the material culture of the Vijayanagara elite. The motifs of birds, animals, and foliage running through the compositions are considered an early precedent for the Kalamkari textile tradition and continue to appear as prints on sarees, woodcut block prints, and home decor products.

Some panels were retouched in later periods, though the original figures have kept their posture and general composition. Erosion over the centuries has been attributed to environmental factors including cobwebs, moss, insect nests, and the soot from camphor lamps used during worship. Many panels remain in good condition.

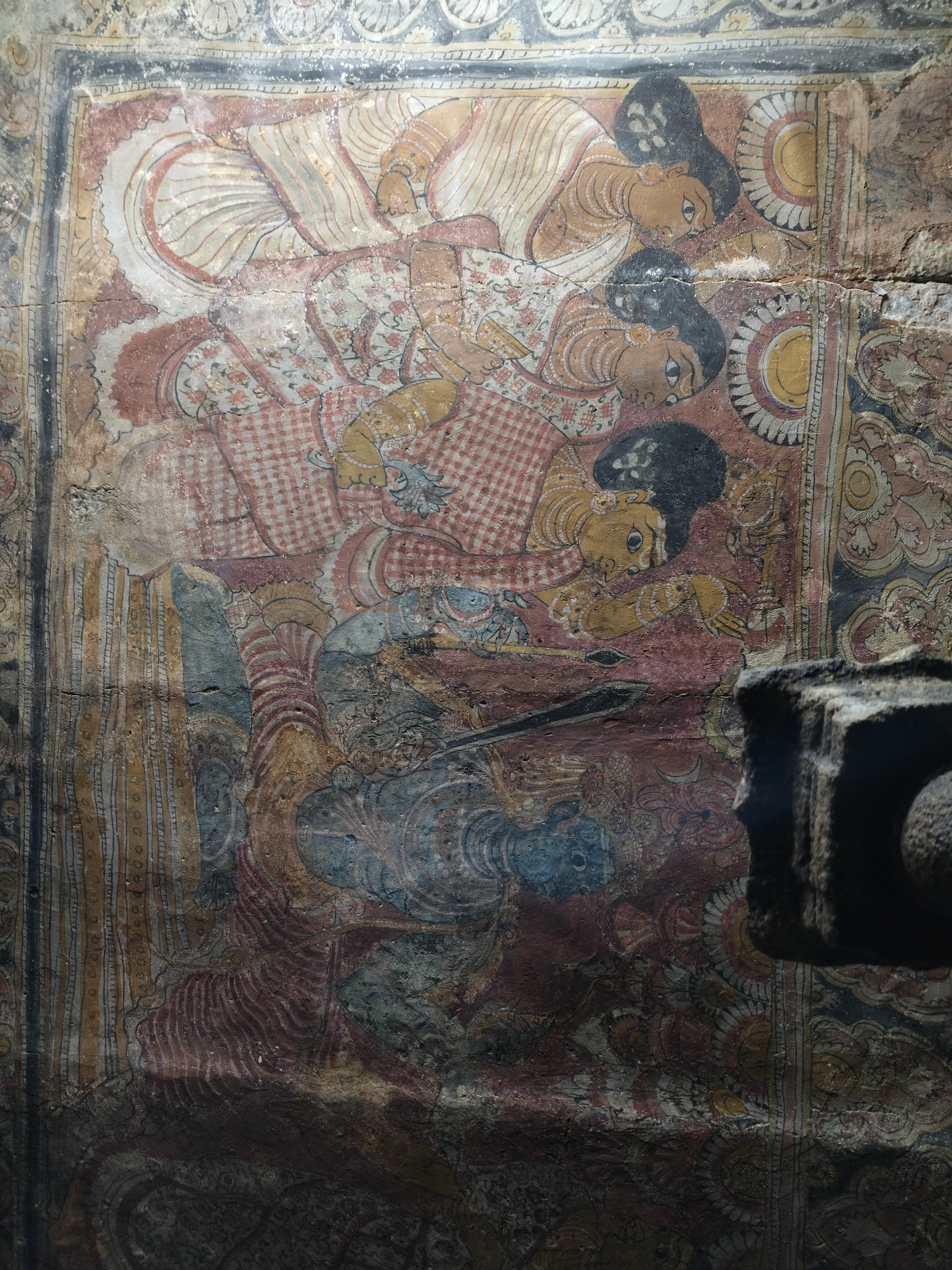
Mural depicting a blue-skinned deity with attendants, Veerabhadra Temple, Lepakshi.

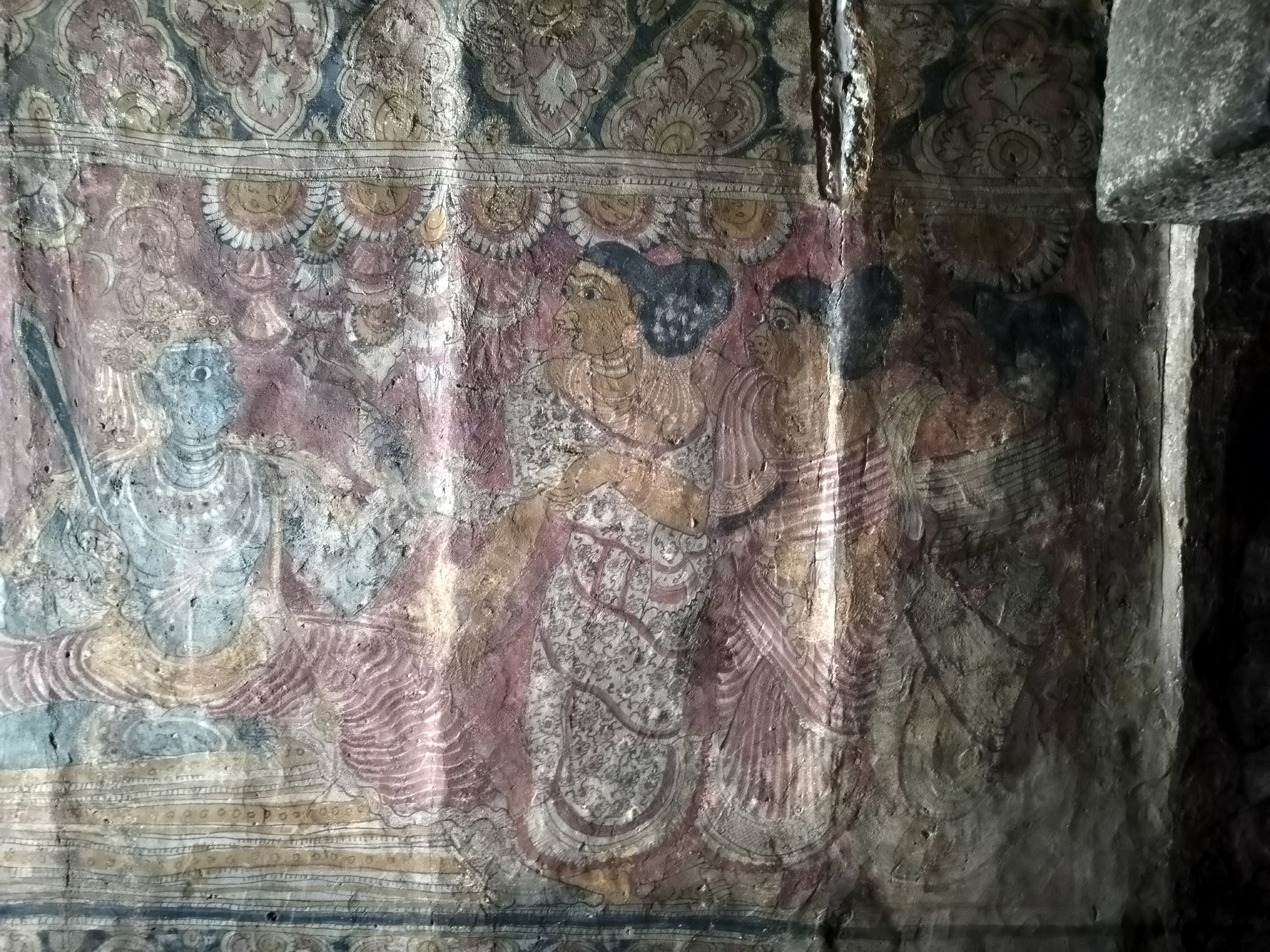
Mural depicting Krishna or Vishnu with attendants, Veerabhadra Temple, Lepakshi.

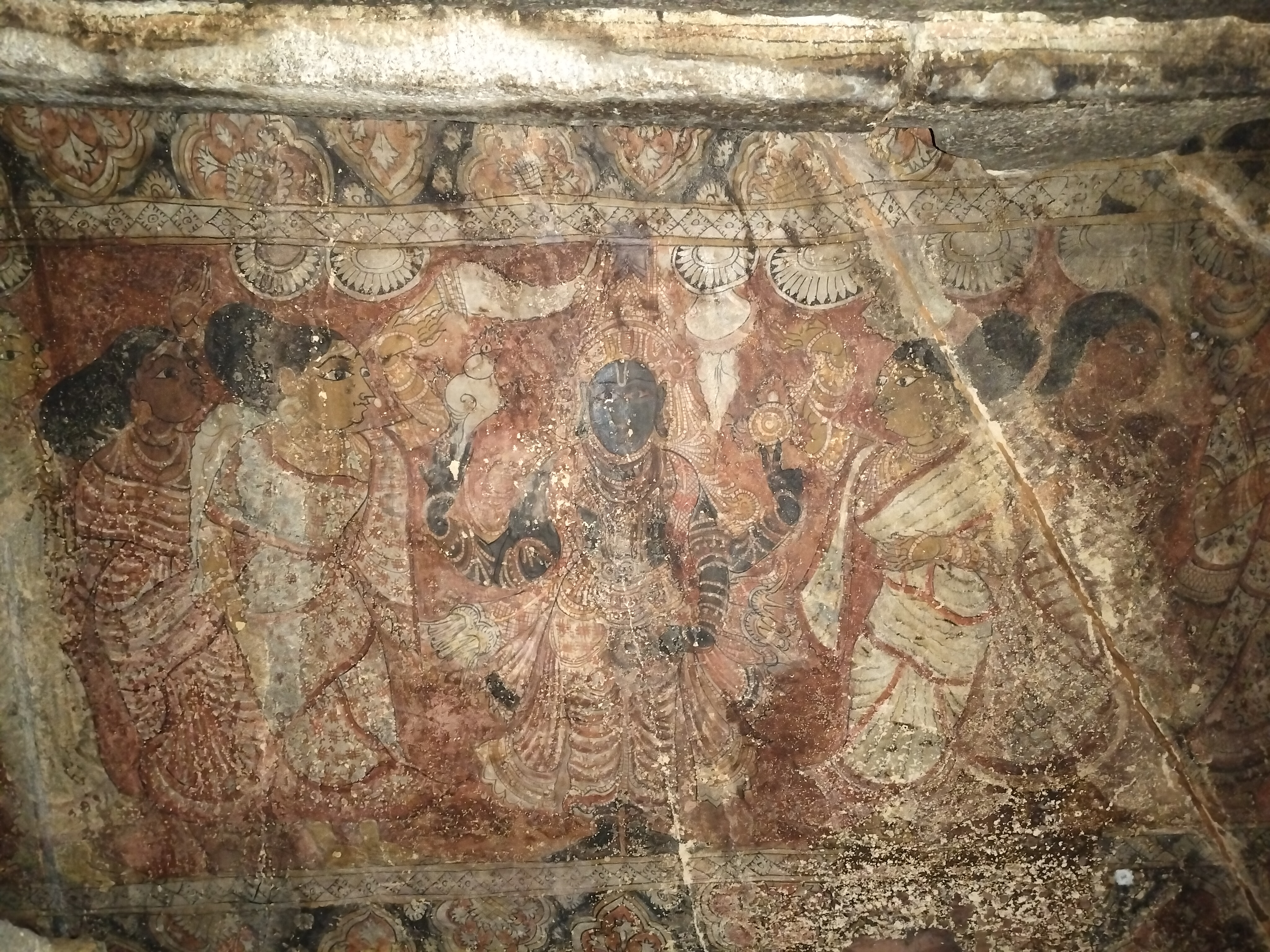
Wall mural depicting a four-armed deity, likely Vishnu, Veerabhadra Temple, Lepakshi.

== Bibliography ==
- Bhardwaj, D. S. (1 January 1998). Domestic Tourism in India. Indus Publishing. ISBN 978-81-7387-078-1.
- Dallapiccola, Anna Libera; Majlis, Brigitte Khan; Michell, George (2019). Lepakshi: Architecture, Sculpture, Painting. Niyogi Books. ISBN 978-93-86906-90-8.
- Knapp, Stephen (1 January 2009). Spiritual India Handbook. Jaico Publishing House. ISBN 978-81-8495-024-3.
- Michell, George (1 May 2013). Southern India: A Guide to Monuments Sites & Museums. Roli Books Private Limited. ISBN 978-81-7436-903-1.
