= Monolithic Bull, Andhra Pradesh =

Sculpture of Nandi in Lepakshi, India

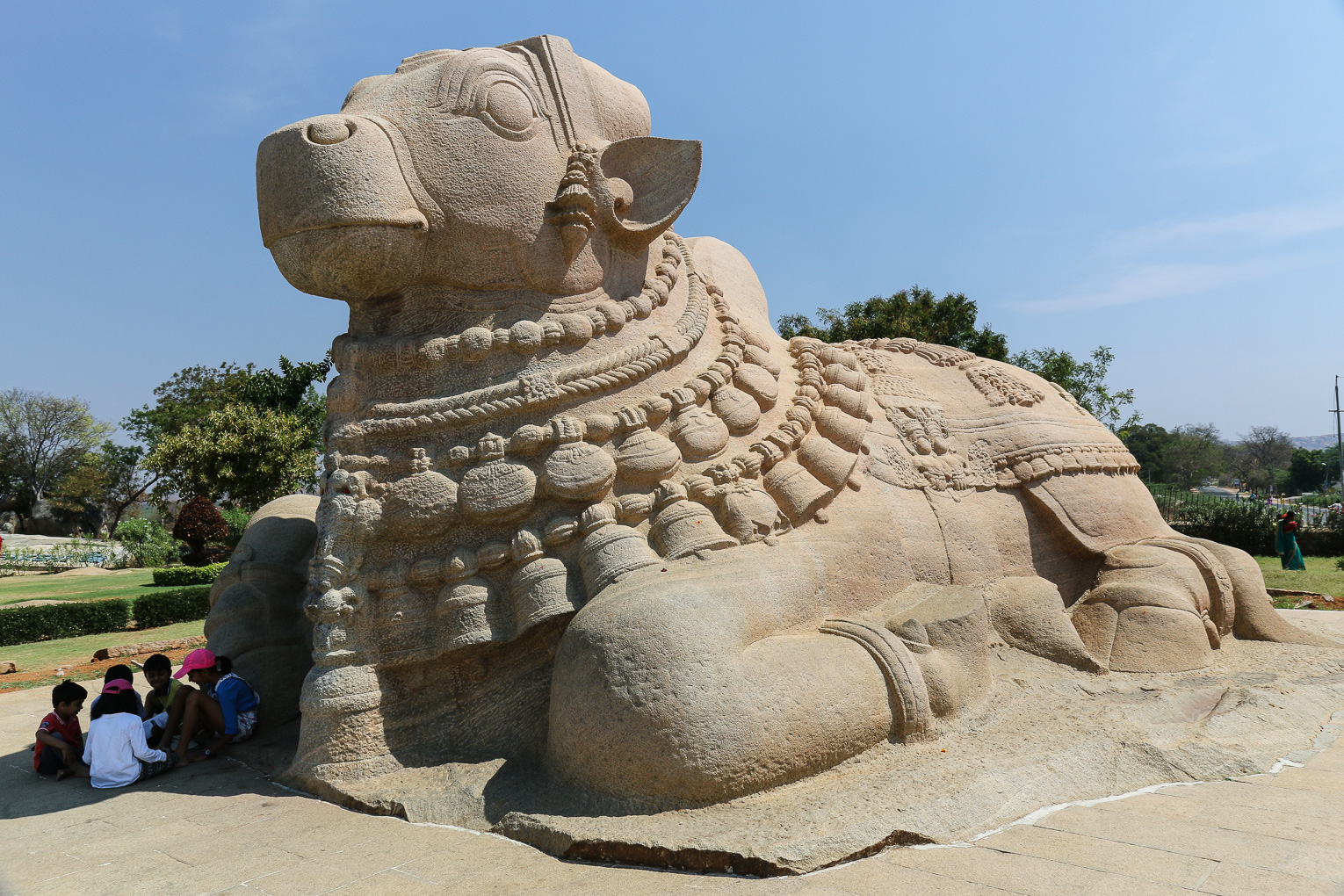

Monolithic Bull is a sculpture of Nandi in Lepakshi, India. It is also an archaeological site.

It is one of the largest single stone Nandi figure in India and it is said to be that it is largest of its kind in India. It is situated 1km far from east of Lepakshi, in the entrance of the town. It is carved out of red granite. It is regarded as one of the finest specimens of the architecture of Vijayanagar.
