= Veerabhadra Temple, Pattiseema =

Veerabhadra Temple
- Location in Andhra Pradesh

Religion
- Affiliation: Hinduism
- District: Eluru
- Deity: Veerabhadra Swamy (Shiva)

Location
- Location: Pattiseema
- State: Andhra Pradesh
- Country: India
- Interactive map of Veerabhadra Temple
- Coordinates: 17.217°N 81.646°E

Architecture
- Type: Chalukyan Architecture

Veerabhadra Temple is located on Devakuta Parvatham, a hillock on an islet amidst the Godavari River near Pattiseema in Eluru district, Andhra Pradesh. The temple is dedicated to Shiva and the namesake is Veerabhadra.

The temple is one of the 'pancha Kasi kshetras' (five important peaceful places) mentioned in the Skaanda puranam, a collection of Hindu religious texts.

== Deities ==
Main deities in this temple are Lord Veera Bhadra Swamy and Goddess Bhadra Kali. Lord Shiva is Self manifested as Veerabhadreswara swamy. Goddess Sathi as goddess Bhadra Kali. According to temple's history Gouthama Buddha did Dhyanam here.

== History ==
This temple is also called as Pattisam Veerabhadra temple.

After few years Dakshaprajapati did Yagna inviting all Gods and goddess. But he did not invite Lord Shiva and her daughter goddess Sati Devi. After asking permission goddess went to his father's Yagna. But his father insulted her and Lord Shiva. Due to this goddess fired her self at Yagna. Due to this Lord Shiva got angry and from his Jatajutam (hair)plucked lock of hair and thrown to ground, from that born Veerabhadra swamy (incarnation lord Shiva) & Bhadrakali.

Then Veerabhadra swamy cut the head king Daksha with Pattisa (warriors instrument). After killing him the rage of lore is very high. And danced Rudra Thandavam on Devakuta Parvatha. After considering all gods request and specially Sage Agasthya embraced him with his hands to cool and make him to calm down. Finally asked to settle here in the form of Shiva Linga(self- manifested) on this hillock as mentioned in SKANDA PURANAM. We can see hand prints on Shiva Lingam on square panel.

Veerabhadra swamy cleaned his pattisam in this river Godavari. From then this places is called as Pattisam or Pattisachala kshetram.

Temple construction -As per Mythology temple constructed by Vishwa Karma.

According to history temple belongs to 12th century, constructed by Reddy kings.

=== Sub shrines ===
Kshetra palaka of temple is Bhavannarayana swamy. The main sub shrine is Lakshmi sahitha sri Bhavannaraya swamy one of Five Bhavannarayana swamy temples of India located in Andhra pradesh.

Sita Ramabhadra swamy temple, Kala Bhaivarava temple, subrahmanya swamy, goddess Saraswati, lakshmi Ganapathi, Suryanarayana swamy& sri thandava Veerabhadra swamy.

== Transport ==
Pattiseema temple is 40 km from Rajahmundry which has nearest airport and railway station. From there can travel through bus or car. After reaching Pattiseema village only means of transport is boat or launch to reach temple. Area surrounded by Papi hills.

== Other features ==
There is a big Hanuman statue at Pattiseema boating point.

Near to this Devakuta hillock there is a hill called Elephant hill (Aanugu shila) where god Sri Maha Vishnu gave salvation to Elephant mentioned in Gajendra moksham.
