= Pattiseema =

Pattiseema Pattisam
- Village
- Interactive map of Pattiseema
- Coordinates: 17°13′07″N 81°38′09″E
- Country: India
- State: Andhra Pradesh
- District: Eluru

Languages
  - Official: Telugu
- Time zone: UTC+5:30 (IST)
- PIN: 534315
- Vehicle registration: AP

Pattiseema is a village in Polavaram mandal of Eluru district, Andhra Pradesh, India. It is located on the bank of the River Godavari. It is a site of historical importance for Hindus. Famous temple named Sri Veerabhadra Swamy Temple is picturesquely located on a hillock known as Devakuta Parvatha located on an island in the midst of Godavari River.

== Demographics ==
As of 2011 Census of India, Pattiseema had a population of 4792. The total population constitute, 2382 males and 2410 females with a sex ratio of 1012 females per 1000 males. 424 children are in the age group of 0–6 years, with sex ratio of 991 The average literacy rate stands at 68.83%.

== Temple ==
The temple houses a life-size statue of Devi Bhadrakali which is decorated with heavy ornaments and a sword. It is known as one of the Panchakasi Kshetrams of the Shaivaites.

== Transport ==
AP TDC runs bus services from Rajahmundry to this village. The temple can be only be accessed through boats run by APTDC.
