= Veerabhadra Temple, Yadur =

Temple in Karnataka, India

Shri Veerbhadhreshwar Temple
- Shri Veerabhadreshwar Devasthan
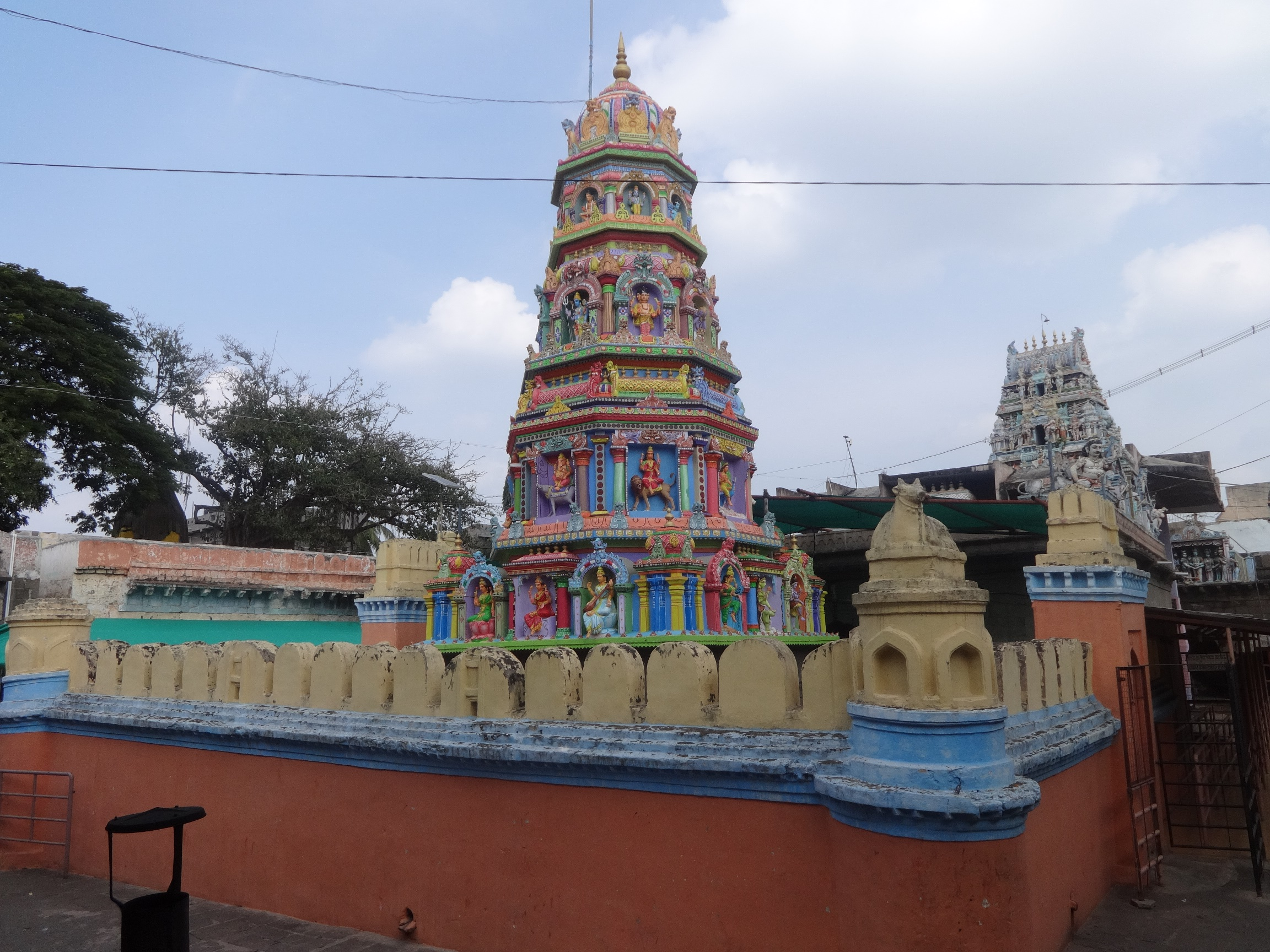

- Location in Karnataka Veerabhadra Temple, Yadur (India)

Religion
- Affiliation: Hinduism
- District: Belagavi
- Governing body: Shri Veerabhadreshwar Devasthan

Location
- Location: Yadur
- State: Karnataka
- Country: India
- Coordinates: 16°34′N 74°39′E

Architecture
- Completed: Earliest records date to 12th Century

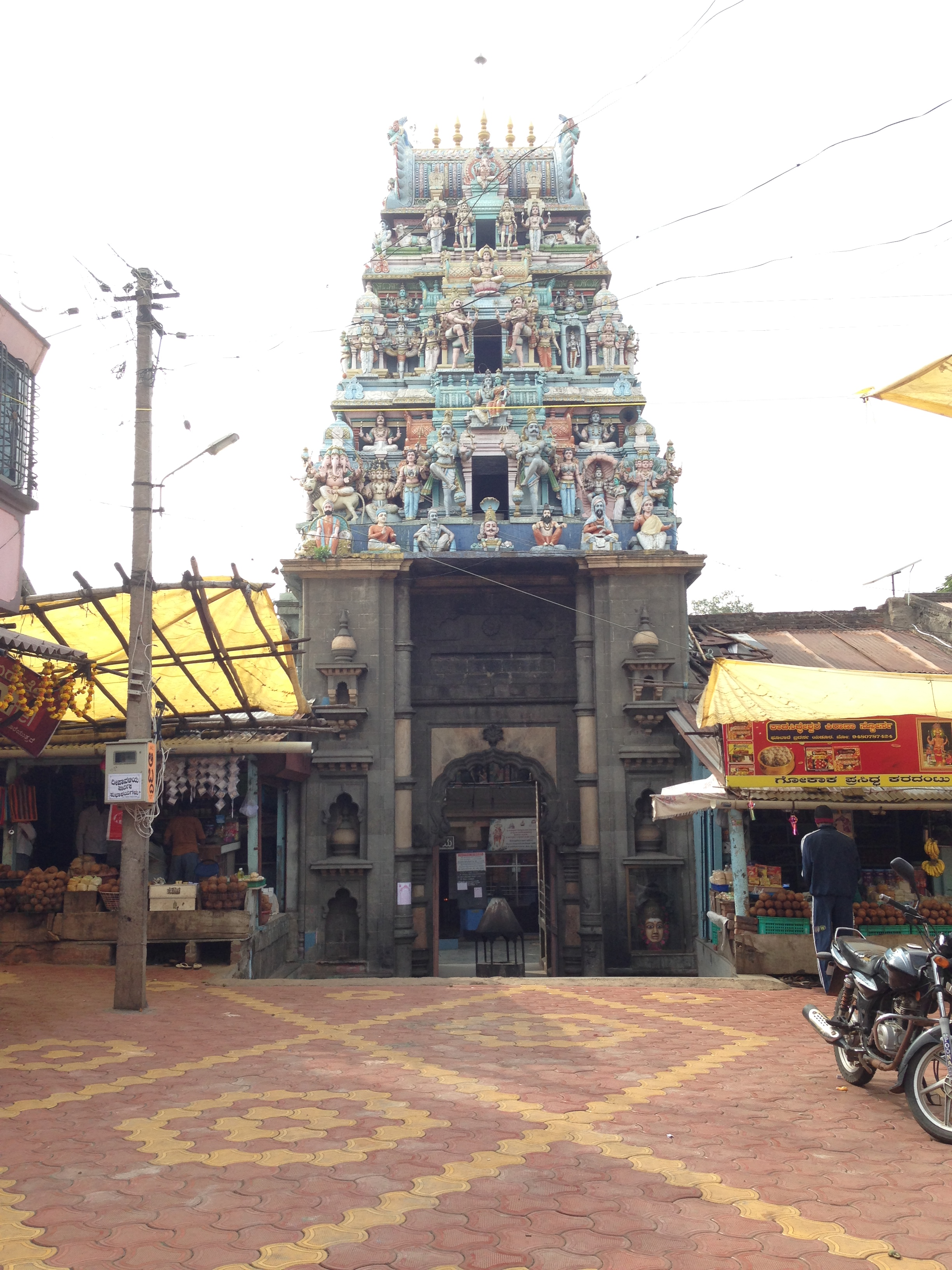
Temple entrance

Veerbhadra Temple is in Chikodi Taluka of Belagavi District, Karnataka, India, approximately 94 km (58 mi) from Belgaum. It lies on the banks of the Krishna River.

== History ==
The temple was built at some point between the 9th to 12th centuries. The temple reflects Dravidian architecture with carved pillars and sculptures. The temple is dedicated to Virabhadra, a form of Shiva.

In 2019, the temple was submerged for 15 days due to the Krishna river flooding. In 2020, access to the temple was controlled by temperature checks and social distancing due to the COVID-19 pandemic.
