= Lepakshi =

Village in Andhra Pradesh, India

- Village
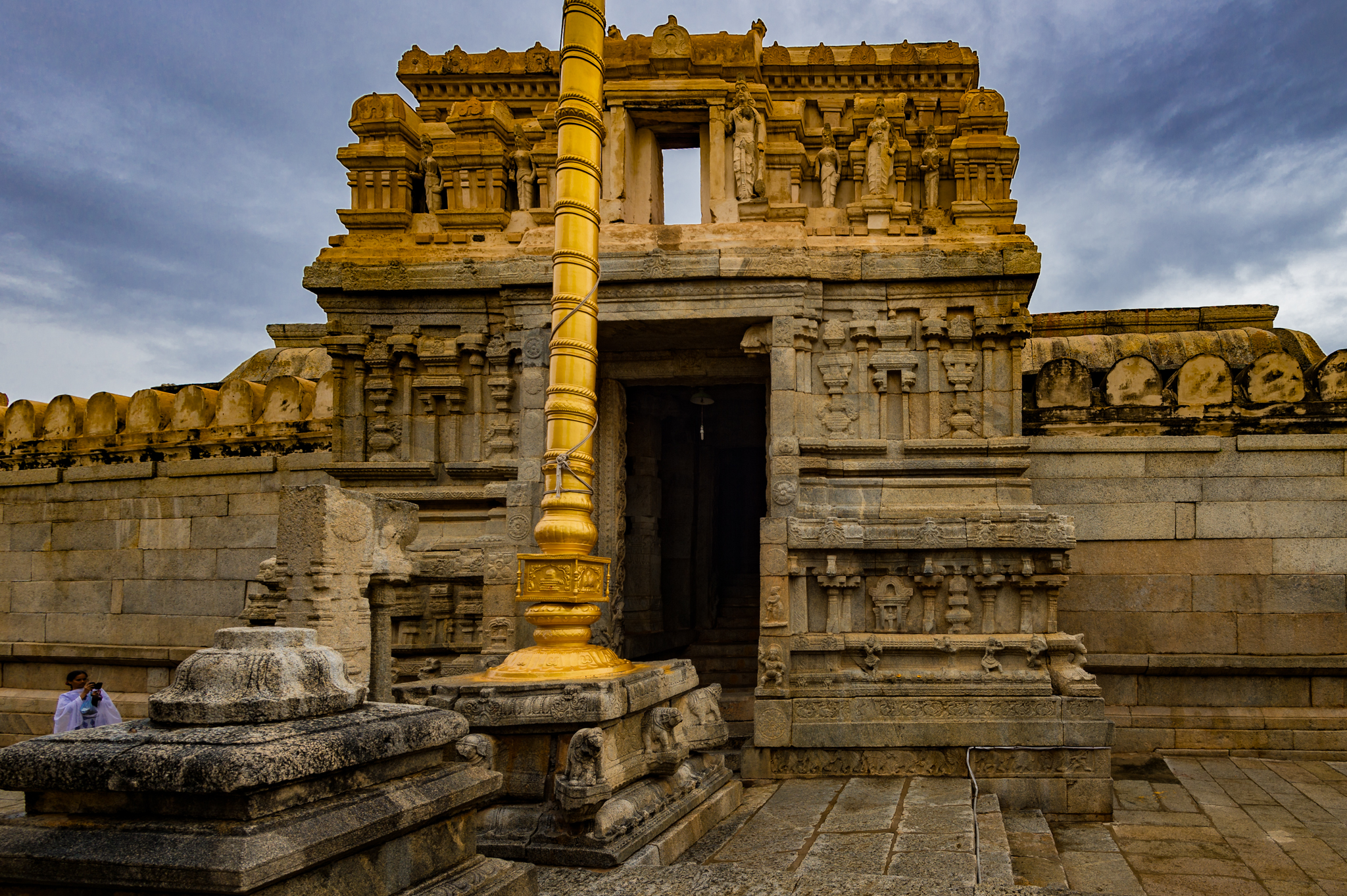
- Front side of Veerabhadra Temple, Lepakshi
- Interactive map of Lepakshi
- Location within Andhra Pradesh
- Coordinates: 13.81°N 77.60°E
- Country: India
- State: Andhra Pradesh
- District: Sri Sathya Sai

Population (2011)
  - Total: 10,042

Languages
  - Official: Telugu
- Time zone: UTC+5:30 (IST)
- PIN: 515331
- Vehicle registration: AP 02

Lepakshi is a village in the Sri Sathya Sai district of Andhra Pradesh, India. It is situated15 km (9.3 miles) eastward of Hindupur, 82 km (51 miles) westward of Kadiri and 120 km (75 mi) north of Bangalore. The Veerabhadra Temple is located in the village.
